= Nightengale House =

Historic house in Massachusetts, United States

- U.S. National Register of Historic Places
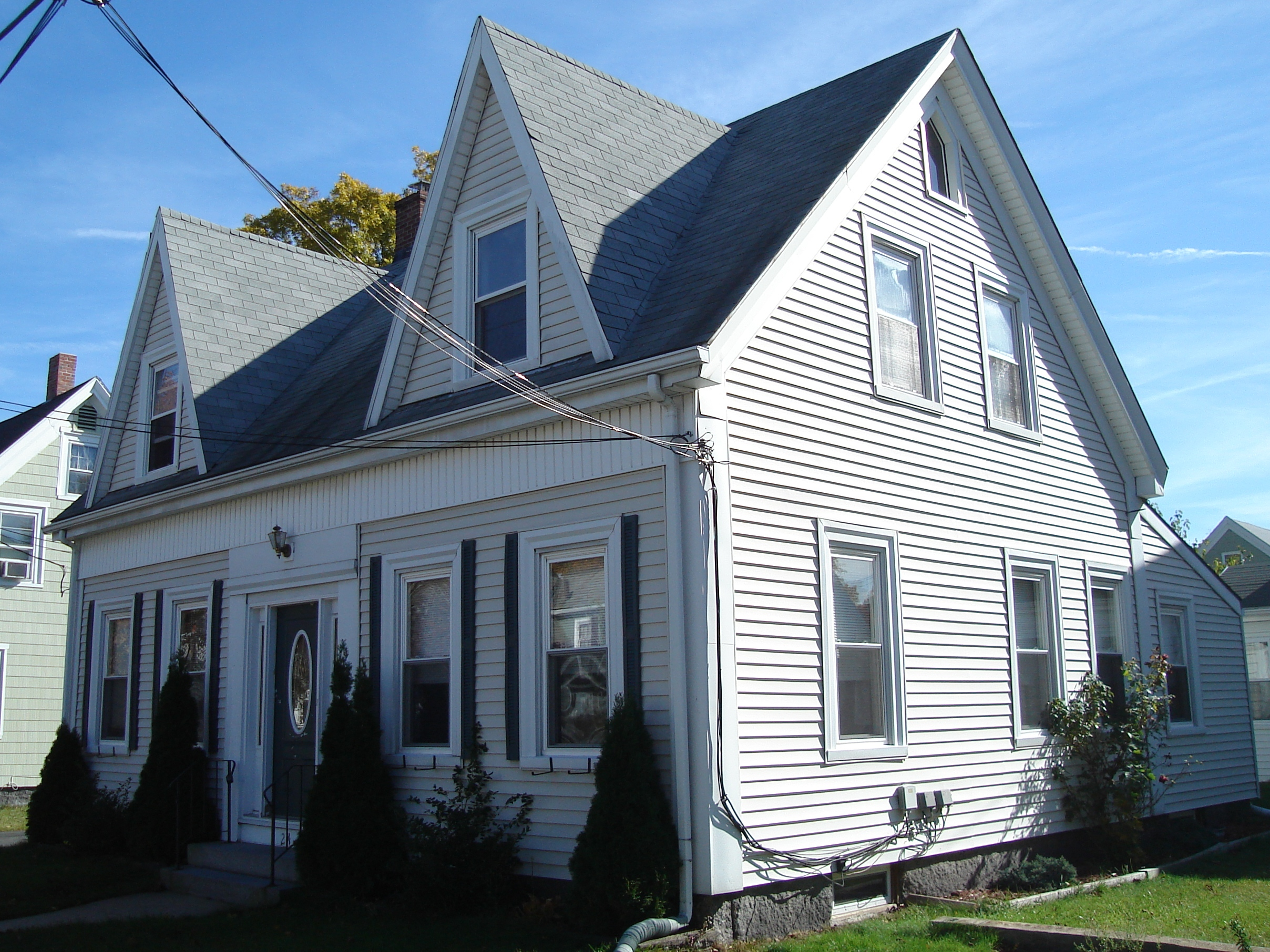

- Location within Massachusetts Location within the United States
- Location: 24 Quincy St., Quincy, Massachusetts
- Coordinates: 42°14′32″N 71°0′23″W
- Built: 1855
- Architectural style: Greek Revival
- MPS: Quincy MRA
- NRHP reference No.: 89001370
- Added to NRHP: September 20, 1989

The Nightengale House is a historic house at 24 Quincy Street in Quincy, Massachusetts. The 1 1/2-story wood-frame house was built in the 1850s, probably by Thomas Nightengale, whose son Jerimiah got the property around 1876. It is a worker's cottage somewhat typical of many built during that time, with Greek Revival and Gothic Revival decorative elements. Its front facade originally had pilasters at the corners, rising to a frieze, but these details have been lost by the application of siding (see photo). Its surviving Gothic details include the steeply pitched front dormers, and pointed-arch windows in the end gables.

The house was listed on the National Register of Historic Places in 1989.

== See also ==
- National Register of Historic Places listings in Quincy, Massachusetts
