= Fore River Club House =

- U.S. National Register of Historic Places
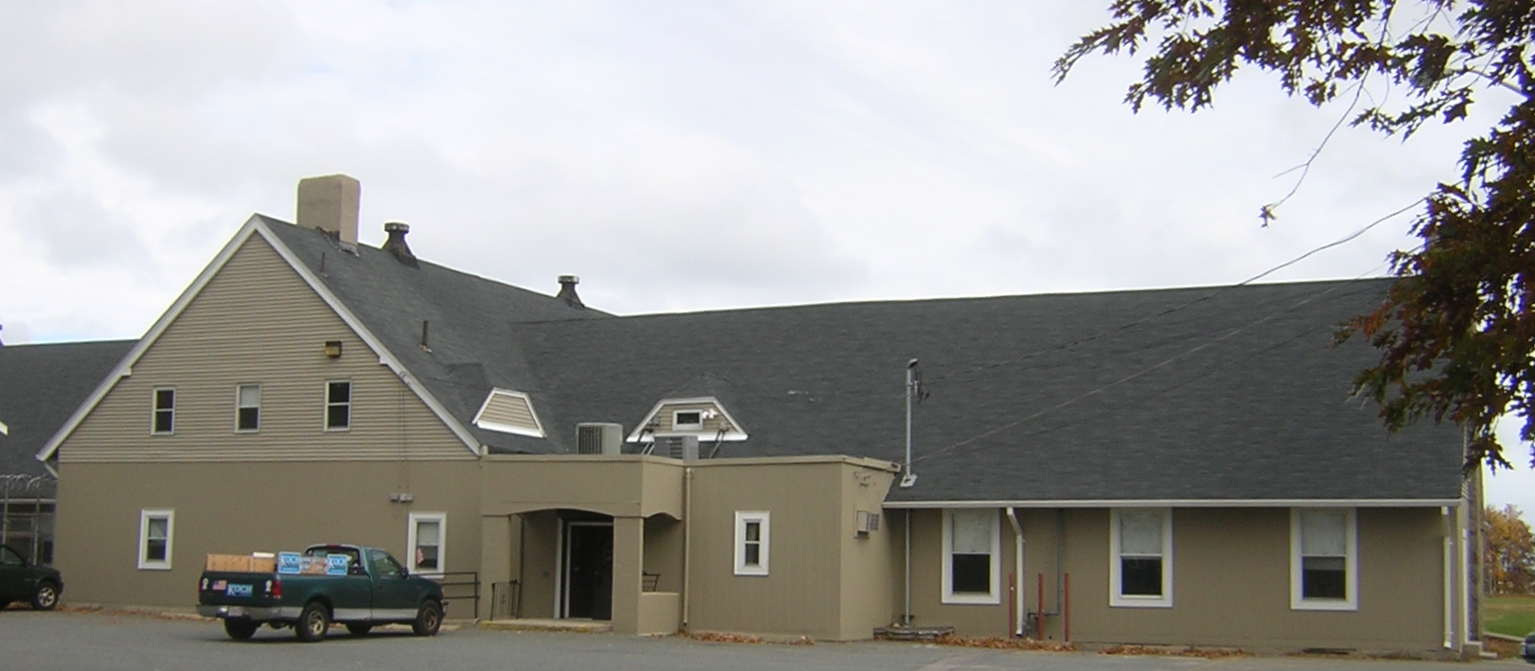

- Location within Massachusetts Location within the United States
- Location: Follett and Beechwood Sts., Quincy, Massachusetts
- Coordinates: 42°14′59″N 70°58′43″W
- Area: 5.4 acres (2.2 ha)
- Built: 1917
- Architect: Scheafer, Gerald
- Architectural style: Shingle Style
- MPS: Quincy MRA
- NRHP reference No.: 89001333
- Added to NRHP: September 20, 1989

The Fore River Club House is a historic club house at Follett and Beechwood Streets in Quincy, Massachusetts. It is a long 1 1/2-story wood-frame structure, with rectilinear eyebrow dormers on the water-facing roof. The Shingle-style clubhouse was built in 1917 by the Fore River Shipyard as a recreation center for its employees. It originally housed a ballroom, bowling lanes, and billiard room. It was acquired by the city in 1925, and is now a community center.

The building was listed on the National Register of Historic Places in 1989.

== Gallery ==
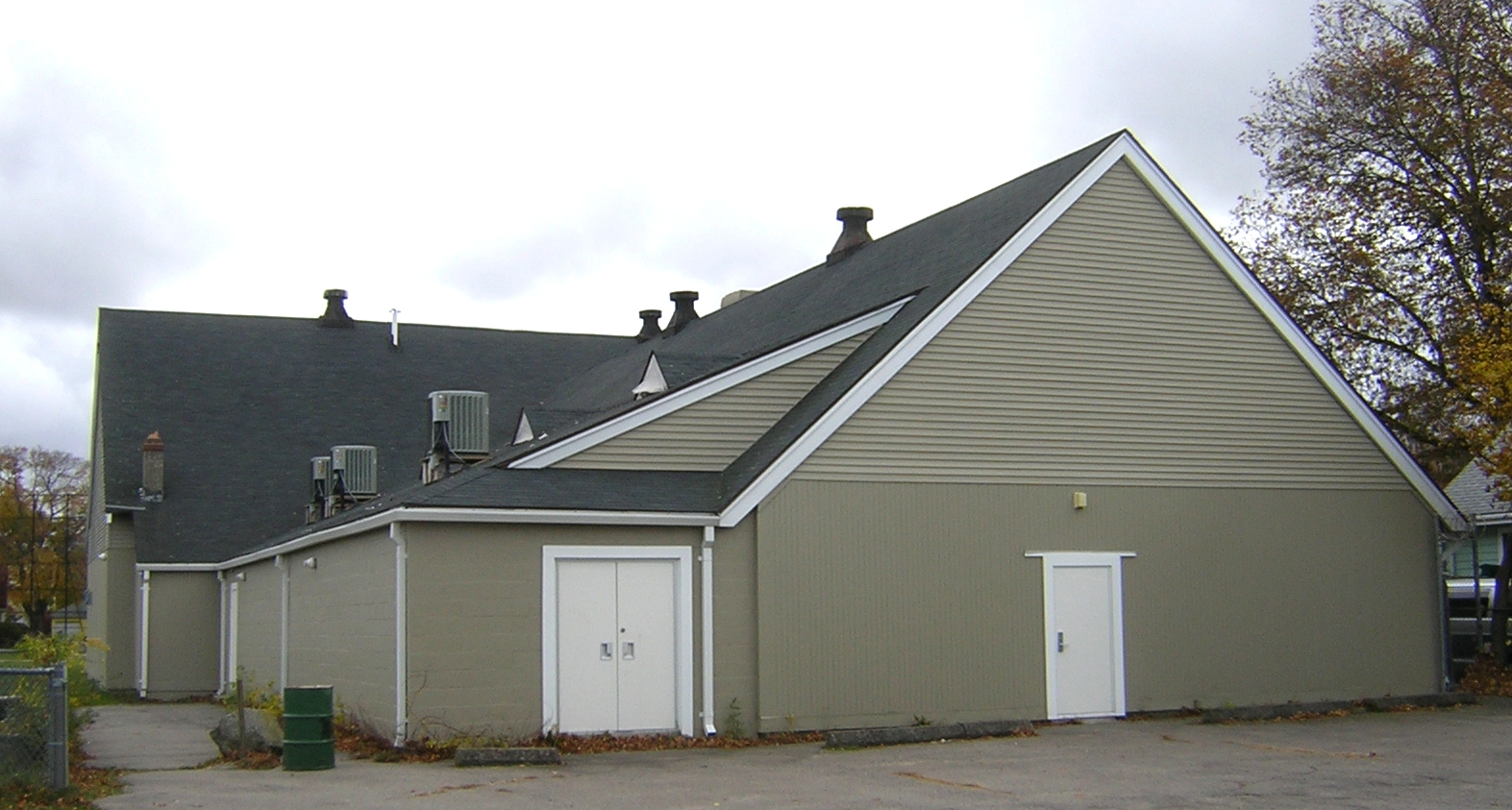

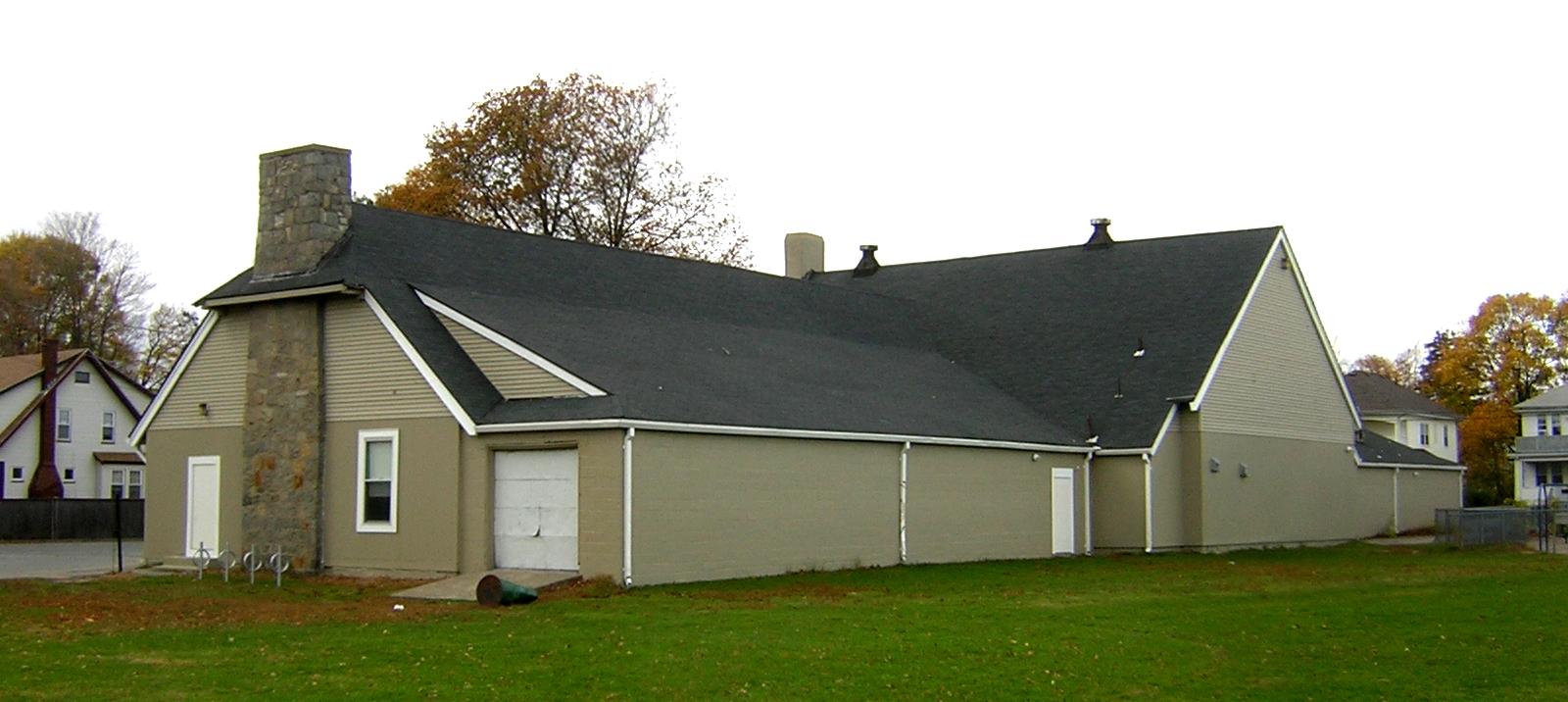

== See also ==
- National Register of Historic Places listings in Quincy, Massachusetts
