= House at 20 Sterling Street =

Historic house in Massachusetts, United States

- U.S. National Register of Historic Places
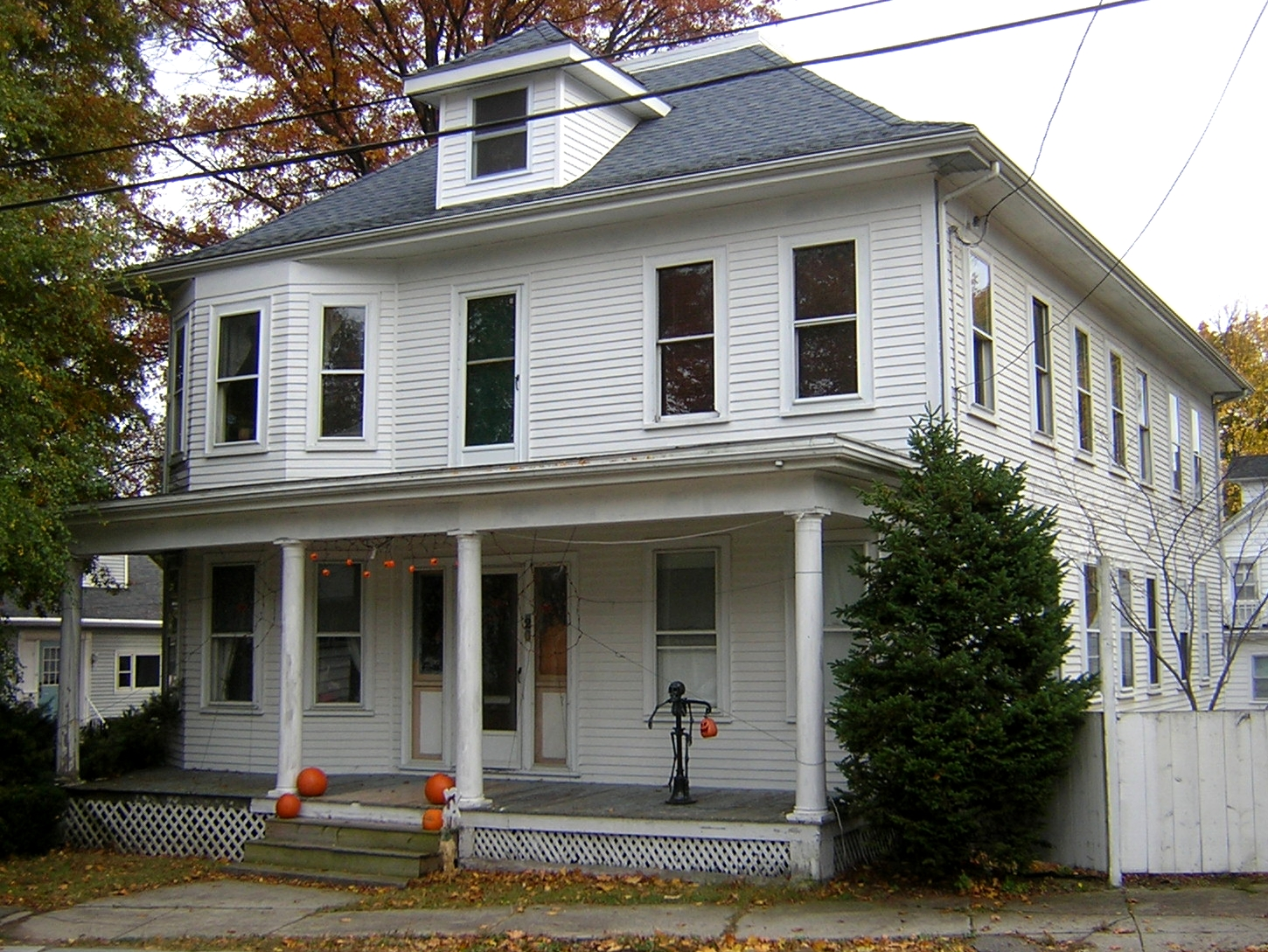

- Location within Massachusetts Location within the United States
- Location: 20 Sterling St., Quincy, Massachusetts
- Coordinates: 42°16′18.5″N 71°2′10″W
- Area: 0.2 acres (0.081 ha)
- Built: 1911
- Architectural style: Colonial Revival, American Four-Square
- MPS: Quincy MRA
- NRHP reference No.: 89001377
- Added to NRHP: September 20, 1989

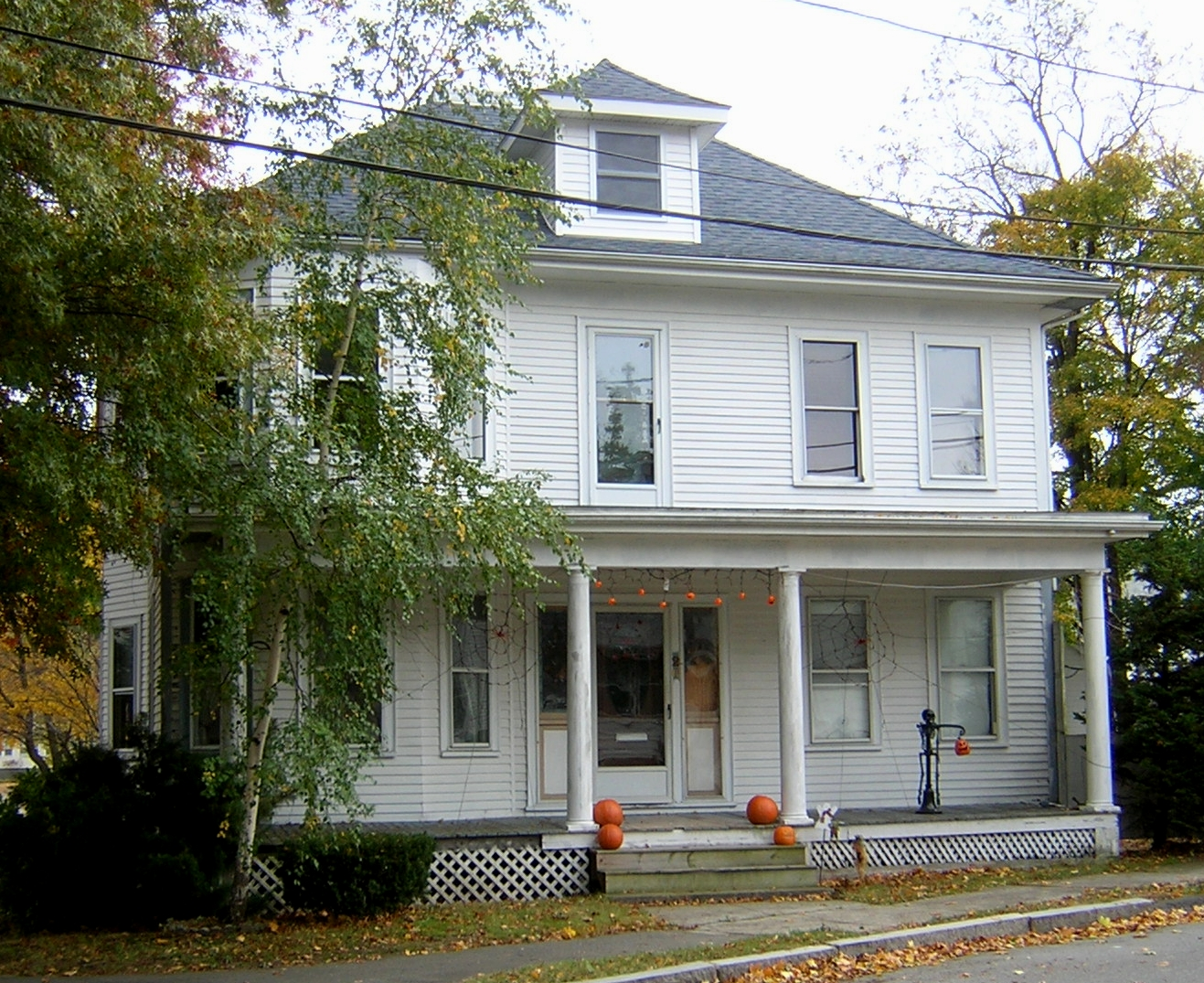

The House at 20 Sterling Street in Quincy, Massachusetts, is a well-preserved Colonial Revival duplex. The two-story wood-frame house was built in 1911 by Henry Grass, a local contractor who built a number of homes in the Quincy area. The Foursquare house has a hip roof with a wide overhang, with hip-roofed dormers. The full width of the front has a single-story porch, supported by four round columns, and there are bay windows project from the front and side.

The house was listed on the National Register of Historic Places in 1989.

== See also ==
- National Register of Historic Places listings in Quincy, Massachusetts
