= Solon Dogget House =

Historic house in Massachusetts, United States

- U.S. National Register of Historic Places
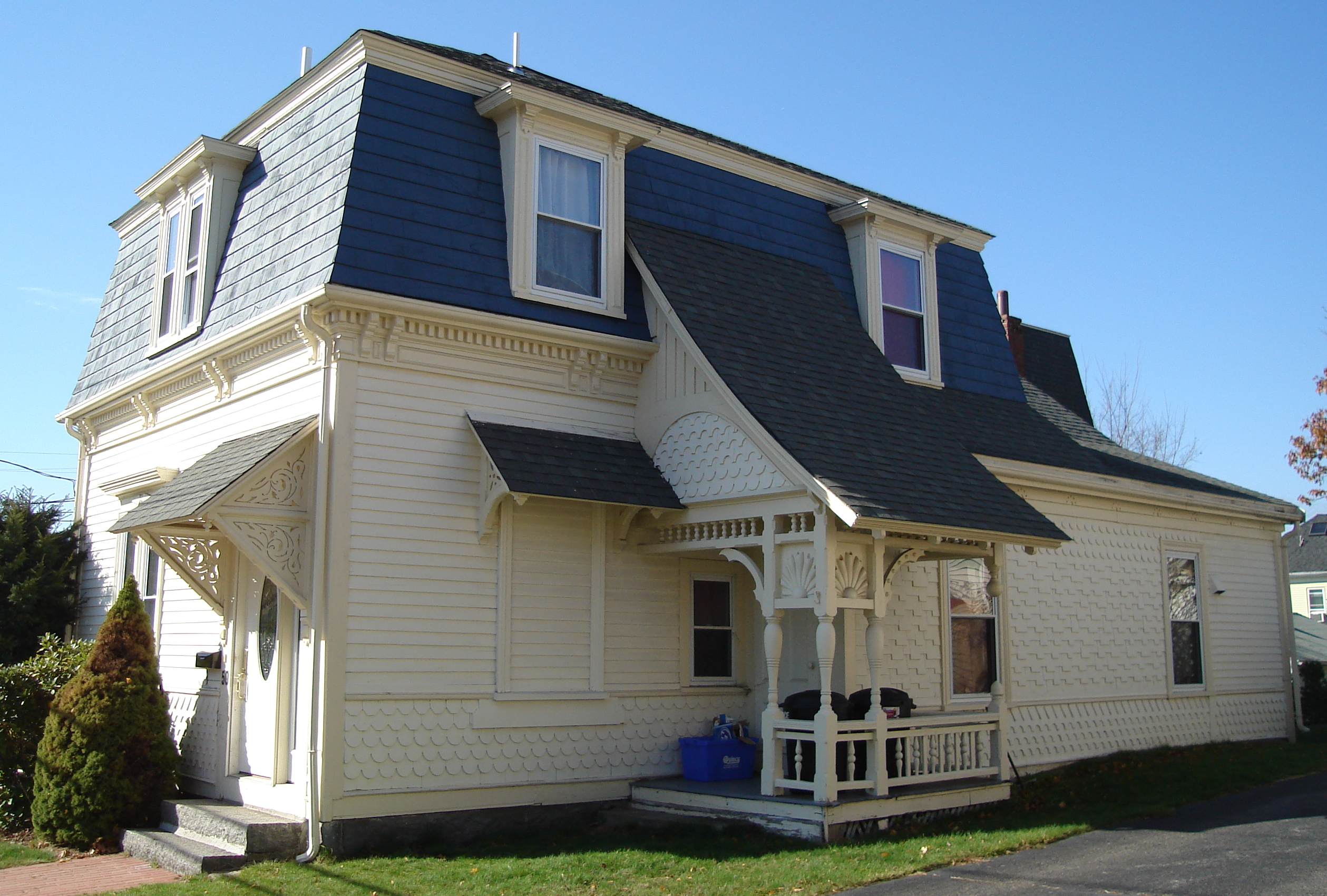
- Solon Dogget House

- Location within Massachusetts Location within the United States
- Location: 50 Union St., Quincy, Massachusetts
- Coordinates: 42°14′56″N 70°59′52″W
- Built: 1872
- Architectural style: Second Empire
- MPS: Quincy MRA
- NRHP reference No.: 89001379
- Added to NRHP: September 20, 1989

The Solon Dogget House is a historic house at 50 Union Street in Quincy, Massachusetts. The 1 1/2-story wood-frame house was built in 1872 by Henry G. Pratt, who sold it to Solon Dogget, a poet and artist. It is a well-preserved local example of Second Empire style, with a mansard roof, patterned shingling on the walls, and Queen Anne porches with spindled friezes and turned posts. It has Stick style bracketing on the door hoods.

The house was listed on the National Register of Historic Places in 1989.

== See also ==
- National Register of Historic Places listings in Quincy, Massachusetts
