= Edward J. Lennon House =

Historic house in Massachusetts, United States

- U.S. National Register of Historic Places
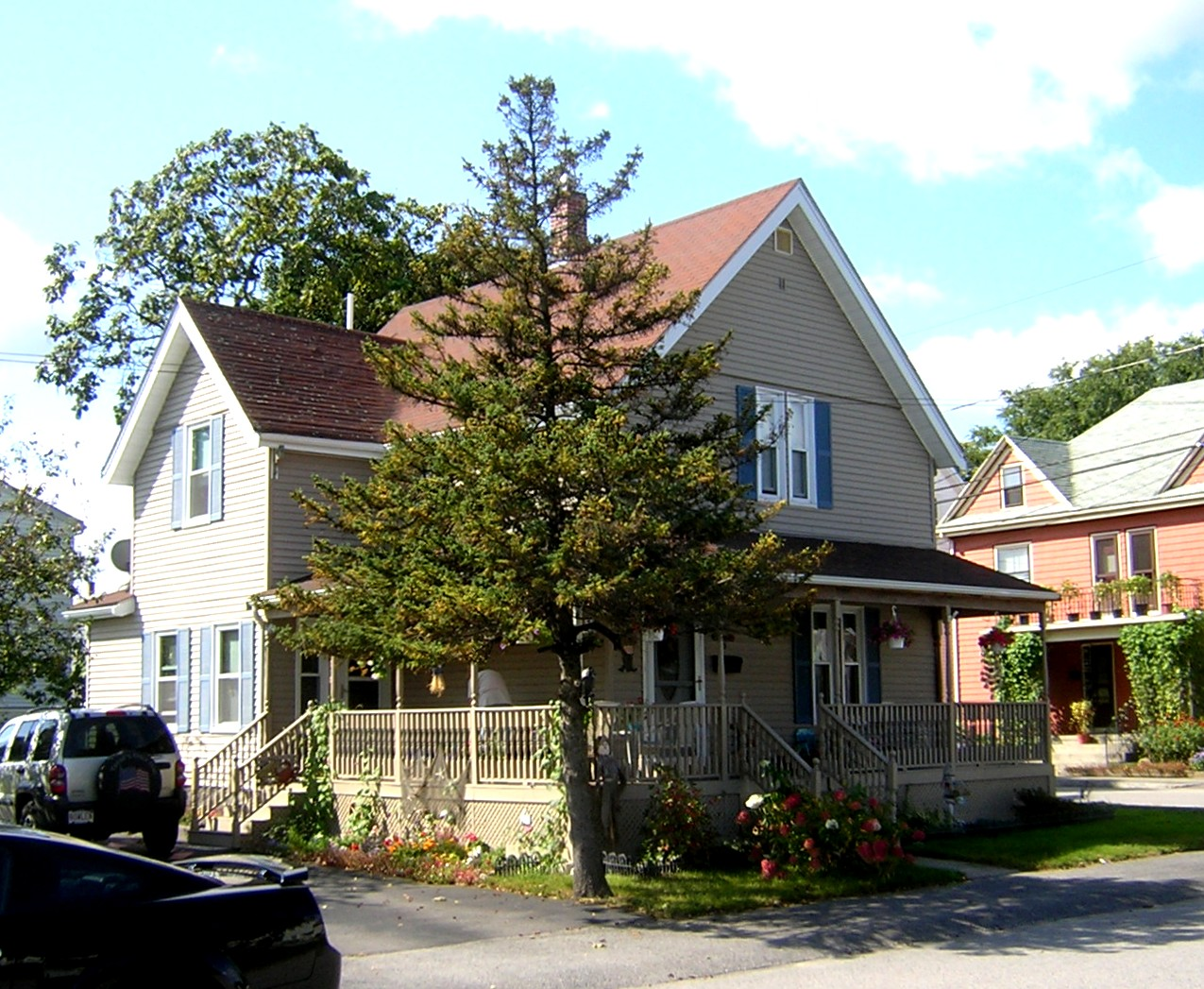

- Location within Massachusetts Location within the United States
- Location: 53 Taber St., Quincy, Massachusetts
- Coordinates: 42°14′12″N 71°0′41″W
- Built: 1888
- Architectural style: Queen Anne
- MPS: Quincy MRA
- NRHP reference No.: 89001378
- Added to NRHP: September 20, 1989

The Edward J. Lennon House is a historic house at 53 Taber Street in Quincy, Massachusetts. Built c. 1888 for a local health inspector, this 1 1/2-story wood-frame house is a well-preserved Queen Anne cottage. Its main gable had Stick style decoration and bands of decorative shingles, and its porch was elaborate decorated, but these details have either been replaced (in the case of the porch) or obscured by the application of modern siding (see photo).

The house was listed on the National Register of Historic Places in 1989.

== See also ==
- National Register of Historic Places listings in Quincy, Massachusetts
