= National Register of Historic Places listings in Quincy, Massachusetts =

The following properties located in Quincy, Massachusetts are listed on the National Register of Historic Places.

This National Park Service list is complete through NPS recent listings posted August 28, 2026.

== Current listings ==
	Name on the Register	Image	Date listed	Location	City or town	Description
1	Adams Academy	Adams Academy	September 6, 1974 (#74000379)	8 Adams St. 42°15′13″N 71°00′23″W		
2	Adams Building	Adams Building	June 23, 1983 (#83000593)	1342–1368 Hancock St.; 1–9 Temple St. 42°15′01″N 71°00′11″W		
3	Adams National Historic Site	Adams National Historic Site	October 15, 1966 (#66000051)	135 Adams St. 42°15′47″N 71°00′42″W		
4	John Quincy Adams Birthplace	John Quincy Adams Birthplace	October 15, 1966 (#66000128)	141 Franklin St. 42°14′21″N 71°00′15″W		
5	John Adams Birthplace	John Adams Birthplace	October 15, 1966 (#66000129)	133 Franklin St. 42°14′22″N 71°00′15″W		
6	Arthur Alden House	Arthur Alden House	September 20, 1989 (#89001382)	24 Whitney Rd. 42°15′15″N 71°00′18″W		
7	Randolph Bainbridge House	Randolph Bainbridge House	September 20, 1989 (#89001340)	133 Grandview Ave. 42°15′40″N 71°01′05″W		
8	George A. Barker House	George A. Barker House	September 20, 1989 (#89001345)	74 Greenleaf St. 42°15′24″N 71°00′16″W		
9	Henry F. Barker House	Henry F. Barker House	September 20, 1989 (#89001346)	103 Greenleaf St. 42°15′23″N 71°00′15″W		
10	Barnes House	Barnes House	September 20, 1989 (#89001362)	183 Pine St. 42°15′40″N 71°01′45″W		
11	S. H. Barnicoat Monuments	S. H. Barnicoat Monuments	September 20, 1989 (#89001325)	114 Columbia St. 42°14′06″N 71°00′44″W		Demolished for commercial development.
12	William R. Bateman House	William R. Bateman House	September 20, 1989 (#89001359)	148 Monroe Rd. 42°15′06″N 71°00′32″W		
13	Baxter Street Historic District	Baxter Street Historic District	September 20, 1989 (#89001309)	Roughly 19-34 Baxter St. 42°14′58″N 70°59′57″W		
14	Baxter-King House	Baxter-King House	November 13, 1989 (#89001953)	270 Adams St. 42°15′12″N 71°01′00″W		
15	Bethany Congregational Church	Bethany Congregational Church	September 20, 1989 (#89001374)	8 Spear St. 42°15′06″N 71°00′04″W		
16	Blue Hills Reservation Parkways-Metropolitan Park System of Greater Boston	Blue Hills Reservation Parkways-Metropolitan Park System of Greater Boston	August 11, 2003 (#03000746)	Parts of Blue Hill Rd., Chickatawbut Rd., Hillside St., Uniquity Rd., Wampatuck Rd., and Green St. 42°13′34″N 71°04′20″W		Extends into Milton and into Braintree and Canton, elsewhere in Norfolk County
17	Boston Harbor Islands Archeological District	Boston Harbor Islands Archeological District	December 21, 1985 (#85003323)	Address Restricted		Extends into Hingham in Plymouth County and Boston in Suffolk County
18	Brown-Hodgkinson House	Brown-Hodgkinson House	September 20, 1989 (#89001319)	42 Bicknell St. 42°15′07″N 70°57′54″W		
19	Building at 1–7 Moscow Street	Building at 1–7 Moscow Street	September 20, 1989 (#89001360)	1–7 Moscow St. 42°16′29″N 71°01′40″W		
20	Building at 51 Hunt Street	Building at 51 Hunt Street	September 20, 1989 (#89001355)	51 Hunt St. 42°16′39″N 71°01′42″W		
21	Charles H. Burgess House	Charles H. Burgess House	September 20, 1989 (#89001381)	17 Whitney Rd. 42°15′13″N 71°00′18″W		
22	Frank Burgess House	Frank Burgess House	September 20, 1989 (#89001354)	355 Highland Ave. 42°15′36″N 71°01′23″W		
23	Clarence Burgin House	Clarence Burgin House	September 20, 1989 (#89001364)	95 President's Ln. 42°15′11″N 71°00′31″W		
24	Central Fire Station	Central Fire Station	September 20, 1989 (#89001371)	26 Quincy Ave. 42°14′40″N 70°59′57″W		
25	Chickatawbut Observation Tower	Chickatawbut Observation Tower	September 25, 1980 (#80000652)	Chickatawbut Rd. 42°13′30″N 71°03′41″W		
26	Christ Church	Christ Church	September 20, 1989 (#89001369)	14 Quincy St. 42°14′43″N 70°59′59″W		
27	Christ Church Burial Ground	Christ Church Burial Ground	September 20, 1989 (#89001372)	54–60 School St. 42°14′39″N 71°00′09″W		
28	Coddington School	Coddington School	September 20, 1989 (#89001323)	26–44 Coddington St. 42°15′08″N 71°00′09″W		
29	Cranch School	Cranch School	July 5, 1984 (#84002872)	270 Whitwell St. 42°14′57″N 71°00′36″W		
30	Frank W. Crane House	Frank W. Crane House	September 20, 1989 (#89001312)	11 Avon Way; 42°15′03″N 71°00′29″W		
31	Thomas Crane Public Library	Thomas Crane Public Library	October 18, 1972 (#72000143)	40 Washington St. 42°15′06″N 71°00′05″W		
32	Noah Curtis House	Noah Curtis House	September 20, 1989 (#89001335)	313 Franklin St. 42°14′02″N 71°00′01″W		
33	Thomas Curtis House	Thomas Curtis House	September 20, 1989 (#89001334)	279 Franklin St. 42°14′06″N 71°00′01″W		
34	Dr. Frank Davis House	Dr. Frank Davis House	September 20, 1989 (#89001330)	25 Elm St. 42°14′48″N 70°59′57″W		
35	Russell M. Dicey House	Russell M. Dicey House	September 20, 1989 (#89001363)	56 Pope St. 42°16′12″N 71°02′14″W		
36	Solon Dogget House	Solon Dogget House	September 20, 1989 (#89001379)	50 Union St. 42°14′56″N 70°59′52″W		
37	Dorothy Q Apartments	Dorothy Q Apartments	September 20, 1989 (#89001322)	36 Butler Rd. 42°15′29″N 71°00′26″W		
38	Elks Building	Elks Building	September 20, 1989 (#89001348)	1218–1222 Hancock St. 42°15′09″N 71°00′17″W		
39	Faxon House	Faxon House	September 20, 1989 (#89001310)	310 Adams St. 42°15′11″N 71°01′02″W		
40	First Baptist Church of Wollaston	First Baptist Church of Wollaston	September 20, 1989 (#89001380)	187 Warren Ave. 42°15′37″N 71°01′15″W		
41	Forbes Hill Standpipe	Forbes Hill Standpipe	January 18, 1990 (#89002252)	Reservoir Rd. 42°15′27″N 71°01′42″W		
42	Fore River Club House	Fore River Club House	September 20, 1989 (#89001333)	Follett and Beechwood Sts. 42°15′01″N 70°58′44″W		
43	Furnace Brook Parkway	Furnace Brook Parkway	March 18, 2004 (#04000248)	Furnace Brook Parkway; 42°14′59″N 71°01′18″W		
44	Glover House	Glover House	September 20, 1989 (#89001328)	249 E. Squantum St. 42°17′00″N 71°01′29″W		
45	Granite Trust Company	Granite Trust Company	September 20, 1989 (#89001351)	1400 Hancock St. 42°14′58″N 71°00′10″W		
46	John Halloran House	John Halloran House	September 20, 1989 (#89001327)	99 E. Squantum St. 42°16′44″N 71°01′36″W		
47	Hancock Cemetery	Hancock Cemetery	January 28, 1982 (#82004421)	Hancock St. in Quincy Sq. 42°15′02″N 70°59′46″W		
48	Hardwick House	Hardwick House	September 20, 1989 (#89001376)	59–61 Spear St. 42°15′06″N 71°00′04″W		
49	Ebenezer B. Hersey House		September 20, 1989 (#89001324)	57 Coddington St. 42°15′10″N 71°00′01″W		NARA ID# 63792429
50	House at 105 President's Lane	House at 105 President's Lane	September 20, 1989 (#89001365)	105 President's Ln. 42°15′11″N 71°00′30″W		
51	House at 15 Gilmore Street	House at 15 Gilmore Street	September 20, 1989 (#89001336)	15 Gilmore St. 42°15′32″N 71°00′38″W		
52	House at 20 Sterling Street	House at 20 Sterling Street	September 20, 1989 (#89001377)	20 Sterling St. 42°16′18″N 71°02′12″W		
53	House at 23–25 Prout Street	House at 23–25 Prout Street	September 20, 1989 (#89001367)	23–25 Prout St. 42°14′37″N 71°00′56″W		
54	House at 25 High School Avenue	House at 25 High School Avenue	September 20, 1989 (#89001352)	25 High School Ave. 42°14′43″N 70°59′58″W		
55	House at 32 Bayview Avenue	House at 32 Bayview Avenue	September 20, 1989 (#89001314)	32 Bayview Ave. 42°16′17″N 70°57′02″W		
56	House at 92 Willard Street	House at 92 Willard Street	September 20, 1989 (#89001383)	92 Willard St. 42°15′07″N 71°02′13″W		
57	House at 94 Grandview Avenue	House at 94 Grandview Avenue	September 20, 1989 (#89001339)	94 Grandview Ave. 42°15′46″N 71°01′08″W		
58	David L. Jewell House	David L. Jewell House	September 20, 1989 (#89001338)	48 Grandview Ave. 42°15′50″N 71°01′11″W		
59	Edward J. Lennon House	Edward J. Lennon House	September 20, 1989 (#89001378)	53 Taber St. 42°14′12″N 71°00′41″W		
60	Lyon's Turning Mill	Lyon's Turning Mill	September 25, 1980 (#80000656)	Ricciuti Dr. 42°14′37″N 71°02′52″W		
61	Charles Marsh House	Charles Marsh House	September 20, 1989 (#89001366)	248 President's Ln. 42°14′55″N 71°00′18″W		Torn down for new development.
62	Edwin W. Marsh House	Edwin W. Marsh House	September 20, 1989 (#89001356)	17 Marsh St. 42°14′35″N 71°00′22″W		
63	Masonic Temple	Masonic Temple	November 13, 1989 (#89001952)	1156 Hancock St. 42°15′12″N 71°00′18″W		
64	Massachusetts Fields School	Massachusetts Fields School	November 13, 1990 (#88000960)	Rawson Rd. and Beach St. 42°16′19″N 71°01′00″W		
65	Massachusetts Hornfels-Braintree Slate Quarry	Massachusetts Hornfels-Braintree Slate Quarry	September 25, 1980 (#80000653)	Address Restricted		Extends into Milton.
66	Herman McIntire House	Herman McIntire House	September 20, 1989 (#89001326)	55 Dixwell Ave. 42°15′01″N 71°00′33″W		
67	Edward Miller House	Edward Miller House	March 8, 1990 (#89001358)	36 Miller Stile Rd. 42°14′59″N 70°59′59″W		
68	Moswetuset Hummock	Moswetuset Hummock	July 1, 1970 (#70000094)	Squantum St. near its junction with Morrissey Rd. 42°17′22″N 71°01′18″W		
69	Mount Wollaston Cemetery	Mount Wollaston Cemetery	February 18, 1994 (#94000035)	20 Sea St. 42°15′31″N 70°59′56″W		
70	Munroe Building	Munroe Building	September 20, 1989 (#89001349)	1227–1259 Hancock St. 42°15′08″N 71°00′18″W		
71	John R. Nelson House	John R. Nelson House	September 20, 1989 (#89001321)	4 Brunswick St. 42°17′52″N 71°00′32″W		
72	New England Telephone Building	New England Telephone Building	September 20, 1989 (#89001357)	10 Merrymount Rd. 42°15′23″N 71°00′26″W		
73	Newcomb Place	Newcomb Place	September 20, 1989 (#89001368)	109 Putnam St. 42°15′25″N 71°00′19″W		
74	Nightengale House	Nightengale House	September 20, 1989 (#89001370)	24 Quincy St. 42°14′32″N 71°00′23″W		
75	Solomon Nightengale House	Solomon Nightengale House	September 20, 1989 (#89001342)	429 Granite St. 42°14′43″N 71°00′19″W		House torn down (more likely) or rebuilt beyond recognition.
76	J. Martin Nowland House	J. Martin Nowland House	September 20, 1989 (#89001329)	31 Edgemere Rd. 42°15′22″N 71°00′13″W		
77	C. F. Pettengill House	C. F. Pettengill House	November 13, 1989 (#89001951)	53 Revere Rd. 42°14′52″N 71°00′02″W		
78	Pinkham House	Pinkham House	September 20, 1989 (#89001384)	79 Winthrop Ave. 42°15′40″N 71°01′11″W		
79	Pratt-Faxon House	Pratt-Faxon House	September 20, 1989 (#89001331)	75 Faxon Ln. 42°14′30″N 70°59′51″W		
80	Quincy Electric Light and Power Company Station	Quincy Electric Light and Power Company Station	September 20, 1989 (#89001332)	76 Field St. 42°15′16″N 70°59′31″W		
81	Quincy Granite Railway	Quincy Granite Railway	October 15, 1973 (#73000309)	Bunker Hill Lane; 42°14′23″N 71°01′57″W		Encompasses a surviving section of railroad bed
82	Quincy Granite Railway Incline	Quincy Granite Railway Incline	June 19, 1973 (#73000310)	Mullin Ave. 42°14′43″N 71°02′14″W		
83	Quincy Homestead	Quincy Homestead	July 1, 1970 (#70000095)	34 Butler Road; 42°15′28″N 71°00′28″W		
84	Quincy Point Fire Station	Quincy Point Fire Station	February 18, 1994 (#93000347)	615 Washington St. 42°14′46″N 70°58′37″W		
85	Quincy Police Station	Quincy Police Station	March 8, 1990 (#89001373)	442 Southern Artery; 42°15′21″N 70°59′47″W		Demolished in 2026
86	Quincy Savings Bank	Quincy Savings Bank	September 20, 1989 (#89001350)	1370 Hancock St. 42°15′00″N 71°00′09″W		
87	Quincy School	Quincy School	June 23, 1983 (#83000599)	94 Newbury Ave. 42°16′50″N 71°01′44″W		
88	Quincy Shore Drive	Quincy Shore Drive	June 23, 2003 (#03000575)	Quincy Shore Drive; 42°16′35″N 71°01′04″W		
89	Quincy Town Hall	Quincy Town Hall	January 11, 1980 (#80000649)	1305 Hancock St. 42°15′03″N 71°00′15″W		
90	Quincy Water Company Pumping Station	Quincy Water Company Pumping Station	September 20, 1989 (#89001361)	106 Penn St. 42°14′09″N 71°00′27″W		Demolished, now a largely vacant lot.
91	Josiah Quincy House	Josiah Quincy House	May 28, 1976 (#76000285)	20 Muirhead St. 42°16′18″N 71°00′56″W		
92	Jonathan Dexter Record House	Jonathan Dexter Record House	September 20, 1989 (#89001337)	39–41 Grandview Ave. 42°15′50″N 71°01′13″W		
93	Timothy Reed House	Timothy Reed House	September 20, 1989 (#89001311)	284 Adams St. 42°15′13″N 71°01′01″W		
94	Alfred H. Richards House	Alfred H. Richards House	September 20, 1989 (#89001353)	354 Highland Ave. 42°15′37″N 71°01′17″W		
95	Salem Lutheran Church	Salem Lutheran Church	September 20, 1989 (#89001341)	199 Granite St. 42°14′41″N 71°00′31″W		Now named "Faith Lutheran Church"
96	George A. Sidelinger House	George A. Sidelinger House	September 20, 1989 (#89001313)	19 Avon Way; 42°15′02″N 71°00′30″W		
97	A. C. Smith & Co. Gas Station	A. C. Smith & Co. Gas Station	February 23, 1994 (#94000036)	117 Beale St. 42°15′54″N 71°01′16″W		
98	South Junior High School	South Junior High School	September 20, 1989 (#89001343)	444 Granite St. 42°14′24″N 71°00′59″W		
99	Seth Spear Homestead	Seth Spear Homestead	September 20, 1989 (#89001375)	47–49 Spear St. 42°15′06″N 71°00′05″W		
100	United First Parish Church (Unitarian) of Quincy	United First Parish Church (Unitarian) of Quincy	December 30, 1970 (#70000734)	1266 Hancock St. 42°15′04″N 71°00′13″W		
101	US Post Office-Quincy Main	US Post Office-Quincy Main	May 23, 1986 (#86001217)	47 Washington St. 42°15′03″N 71°00′08″W		
102	Charles E. White House	Charles E. White House	September 20, 1989 (#89001320)	101 Billings Rd. 42°16′28″N 71°01′24″W		
103	Winfield House	Winfield House	September 20, 1989 (#89001347)	853 Hancock St. 42°15′43″N 71°00′47″W		Stairway leading up to vacant house lot. Burned some time ago.
104	John Winthrop, Jr. Iron Furnace Site	John Winthrop, Jr. Iron Furnace Site	September 20, 1977 (#77000192)	61 Crescent St. 42°14′45″N 71°01′37″W		Although NRIS shows this as "Address Restricted", it is a public site, on the Quincy Historical Trail
105	Wollaston Branch, Thomas Crane Public Library	Wollaston Branch, Thomas Crane Public Library	September 20, 1989 (#89001316)	41 Beale St. 42°16′00″N 71°01′06″W		
106	Wollaston Congregational Church	Wollaston Congregational Church	December 5, 2008 (#08001128)	47–57 Lincoln Ave. 42°15′46″N 71°01′12″W		
107	Wollaston Fire Station	Wollaston Fire Station	September 20, 1989 (#89001317)	111 Beale St. 42°15′34″N 71°00′45″W		
108	Wollaston Theatre	Wollaston Theatre	September 20, 1989 (#89001315)	14 Beale St. 42°16′03″N 71°01′00″W		Demolished in 2016
109	Wollaston Unitarian Church	Wollaston Unitarian Church	September 20, 1989 (#89001318)	155 Beale St. 42°15′51″N 71°01′20″W		
110	Woodward Institute	Woodward Institute	November 13, 1989 (#89001954)	1098 Hancock St. 42°15′17″N 71°00′23″W		
