= J. Martin Nowland House =

Historic house in Massachusetts, United States

- U.S. National Register of Historic Places
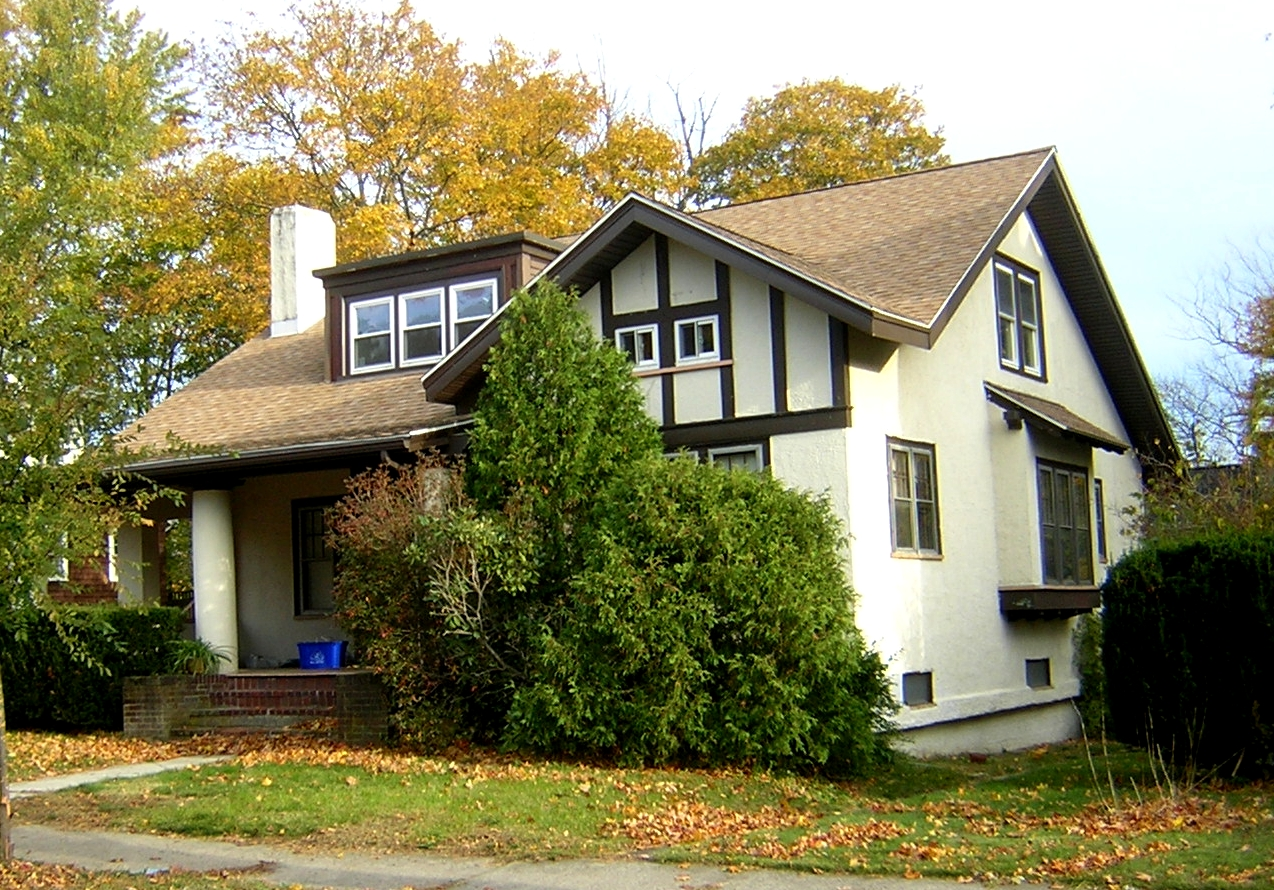

- Location within Massachusetts Location within the United States
- Location: 31 Edgemere Road, Quincy, Massachusetts
- Coordinates: 42°15′20.8″N 71°0′7.7″W
- Area: 0.1 acres (0.040 ha)
- Built: 1915
- Architectural style: Bungalow/Craftsman
- MPS: Quincy MRA
- NRHP reference No.: 89001329
- Added to NRHP: September 20, 1989

The J. Martin Nowland House is a historic house located at 31 Edgemere Road in Quincy, Massachusetts.

== Description and history ==
This 1 1/2-story wood-frame house was built in 1915 by J. Martin Nowland, a local attorney and developer of the Edgemere Road area. It is one of the better-preserved of a number of similar Craftsman/Bungalow style houses in the area, with wide overhangs, half-timbered stucco appearance, and the thick posts supporting the porch over the front entry.

The house was listed on the National Register of Historic Places on September 20, 1989.

== See also ==
- National Register of Historic Places listings in Quincy, Massachusetts
