= Building at 1–7 Moscow Street =

- U.S. National Register of Historic Places
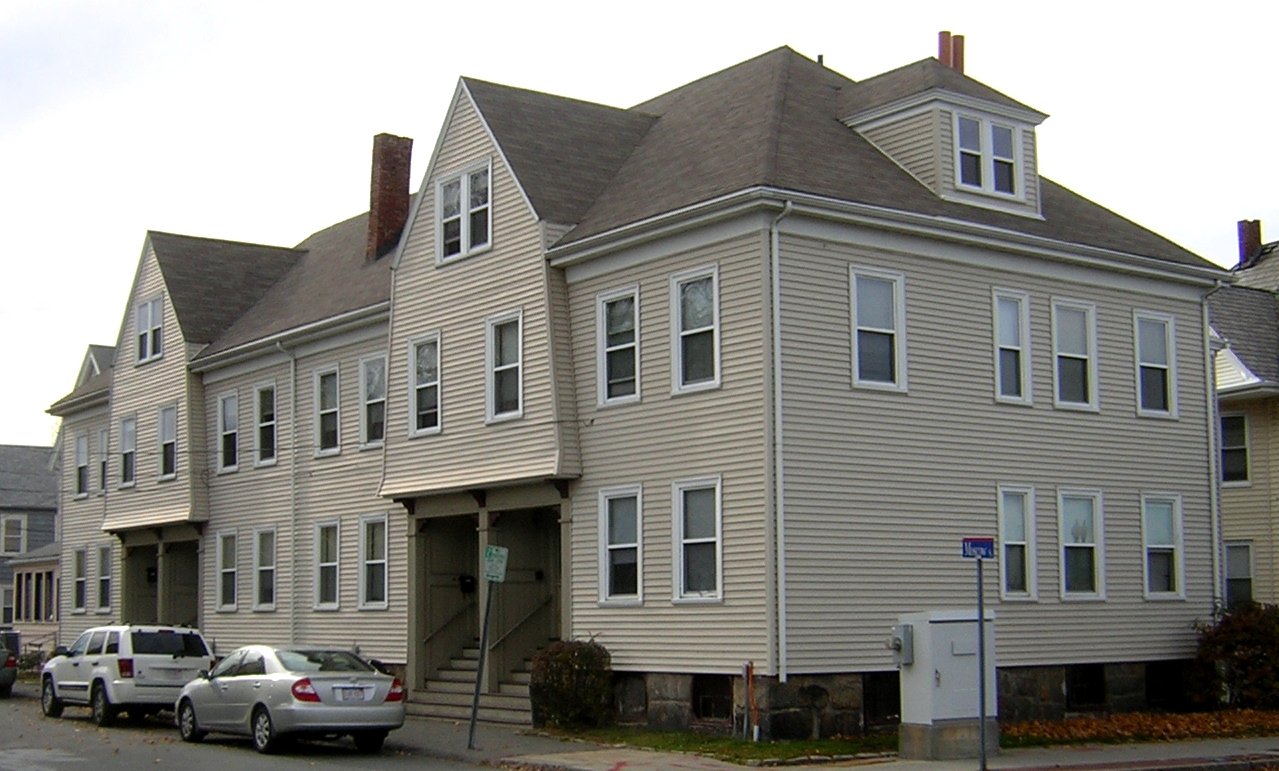

- Location within Massachusetts Location within the United States
- Location: 1–7 Moscow St., Quincy, Massachusetts
- Coordinates: 42°16′29″N 71°1′38″W
- Area: 0.1 acres (0.040 ha)
- Architectural style: Shingle Style
- MPS: Quincy MRA
- NRHP reference No.: 89001360
- Added to NRHP: September 20, 1989

The Building at 1–7 Moscow Street in Quincy, Massachusetts, is a rare turn-of-the-20th century wood frame apartment house. It was built in the first decade of the 20th century, and is a long rectangular 2 1/2-story wood-frame structure, with two sets of paired entranceways The gambrel projections over the entrances are a hallmark of the Shingle style, but its original wood shingle finish has been replaced by modern siding (see photo).

The building was listed on the National Register of Historic Places in 1989.

== See also ==
- National Register of Historic Places listings in Quincy, Massachusetts
