= Jonathan Dexter Record House =

Historic house in Massachusetts, United States

- U.S. National Register of Historic Places
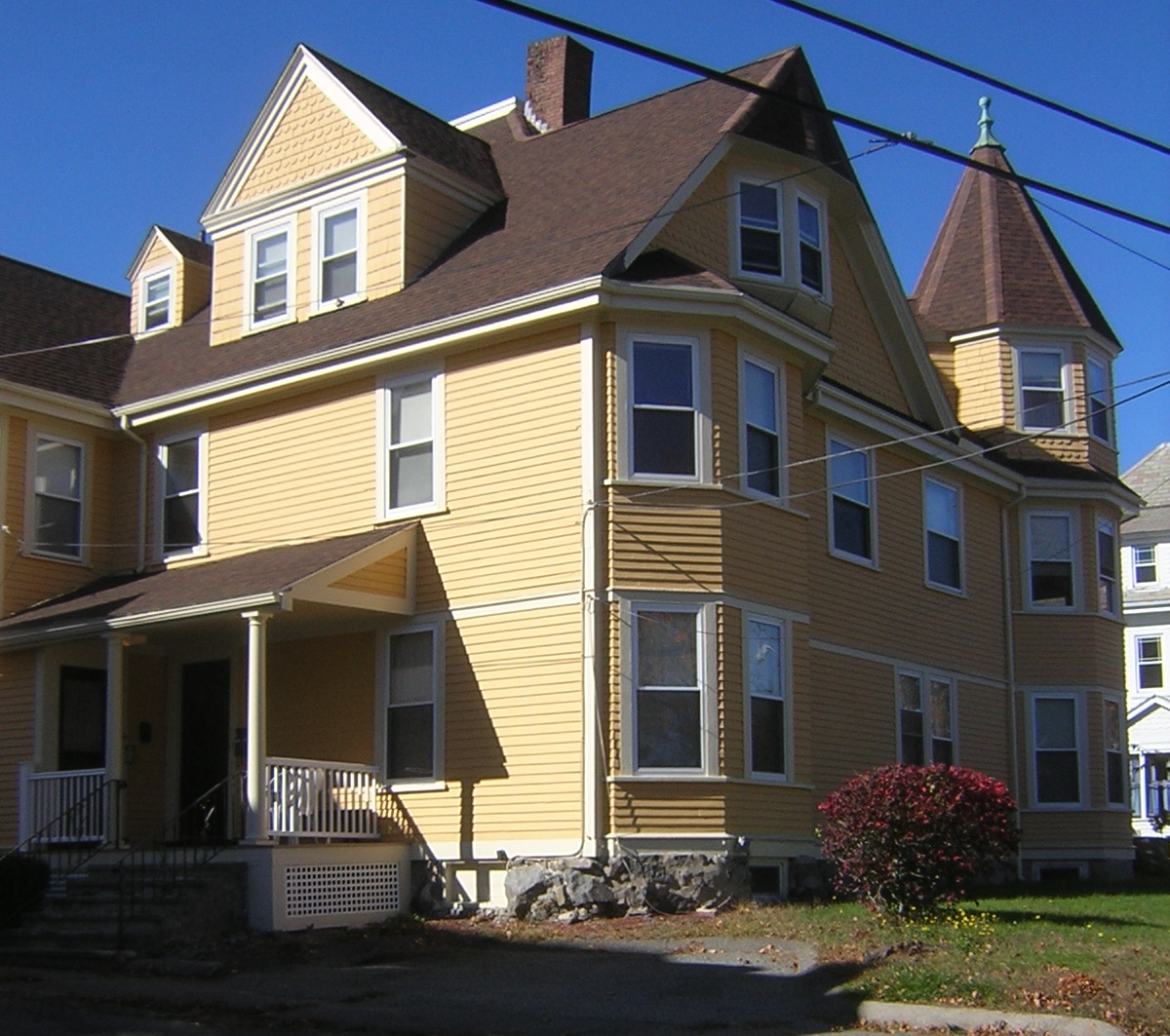

- Location within Massachusetts Location within the United States
- Location: 39--41 Grandview Ave., Quincy, Massachusetts
- Coordinates: 42°15′50″N 71°1′12″W
- Built: 1890
- Architectural style: Queen Anne
- MPS: Quincy MRA
- NRHP reference No.: 89001337
- Added to NRHP: September 20, 1989

The Jonathan Dexter Record House is a historic house at 39-41 Grandview Avenue in Quincy, Massachusetts. This large two-family house was probably built in the 1890s, and is one of the largest and finest Queen Anne houses on Wollaston Hill. It has classic elements of the style, including a three-story tower with conical roof, asymmetrical massing, and a wealth of varying gables and windows. Jonathan D. Record, for whom it was built, was a Boston dry plates manufacturer.

The house was listed on the National Register of Historic Places in 1989.

== See also ==
- National Register of Historic Places listings in Quincy, Massachusetts
