= Seth Spear Homestead =

Historic house in Massachusetts, United States

- U.S. National Register of Historic Places
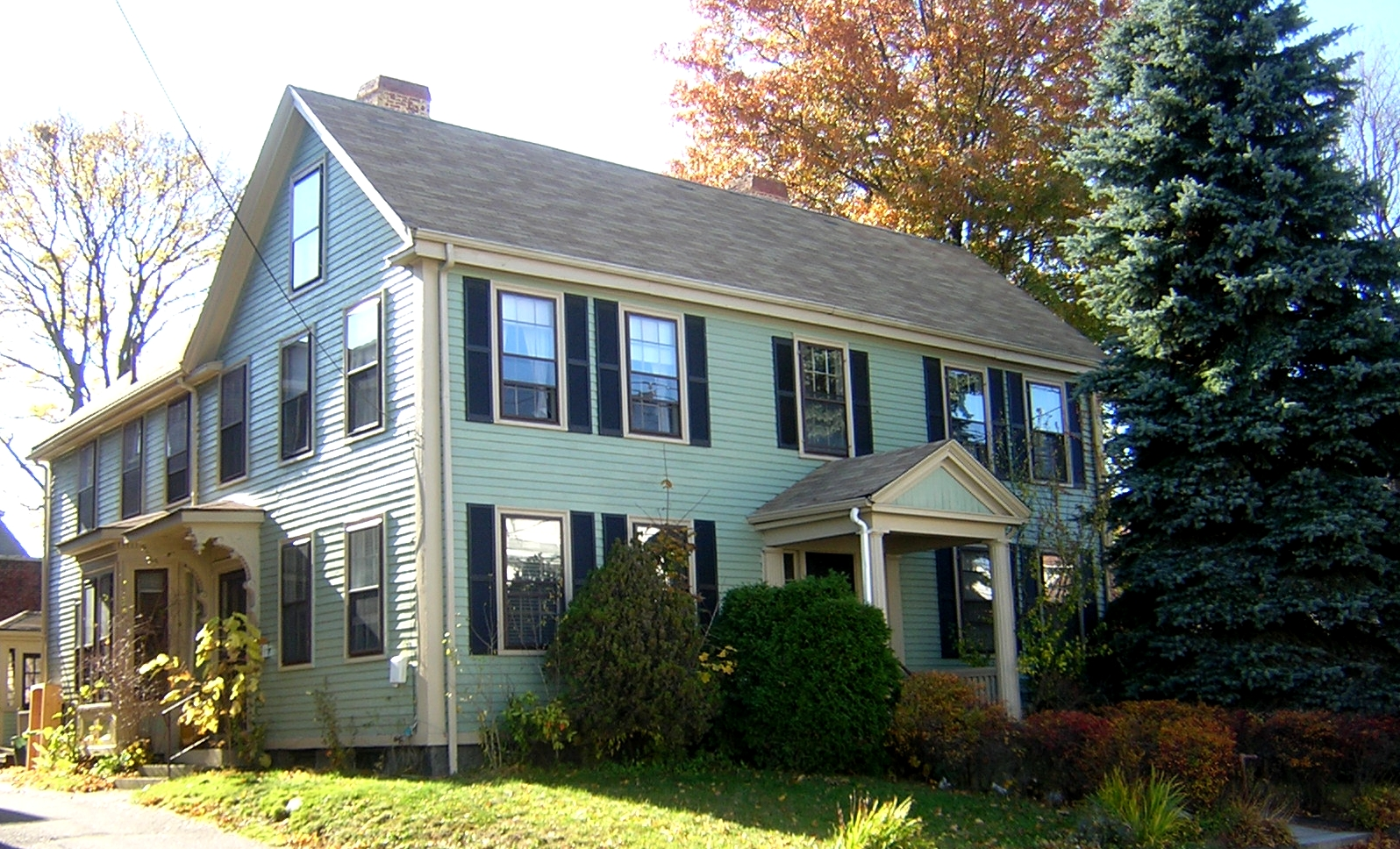

- Location within Massachusetts Location within the United States
- Location: 47-49 Spear St., Quincy, Massachusetts
- Coordinates: 42°15′5″N 70°59′58″W
- Area: 0.2 acres (0.081 ha)
- Built: 1850
- Architectural style: Greek Revival
- MPS: Quincy MRA
- NRHP reference No.: 89001375
- Added to NRHP: September 20, 1989

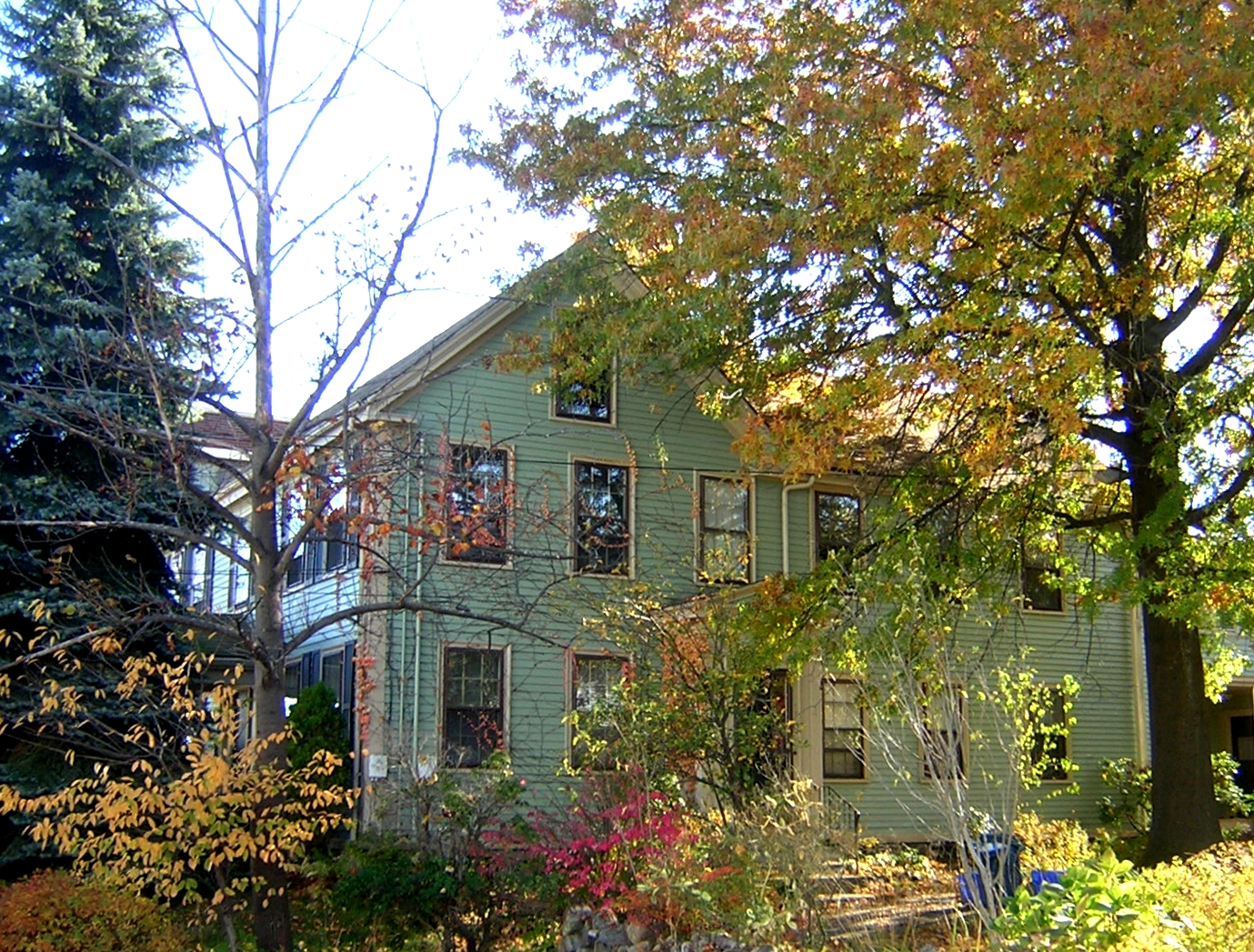

The Seth Spear Homestead is a historic house at 47-49 Spear Street in Quincy, Massachusetts. The 2 1/2-story wood-frame house was built c. 1850 by either Thomas Drake or Seth Spear, who purchased Drake's property. Spear was one of the largest landowners in the immediate area. The house is a fairly typical Greek Revival structure, although it has had a large ell added to the rear (sometime before 1876), and its front portico dates to the 1890s. It now has 5 units rented out.

The house was listed on the National Register of Historic Places in 1989.

== See also ==
- National Register of Historic Places listings in Quincy, Massachusetts
