= Solomon Nightengale House =

Historic house in Massachusetts, United States

- U.S. National Register of Historic Places
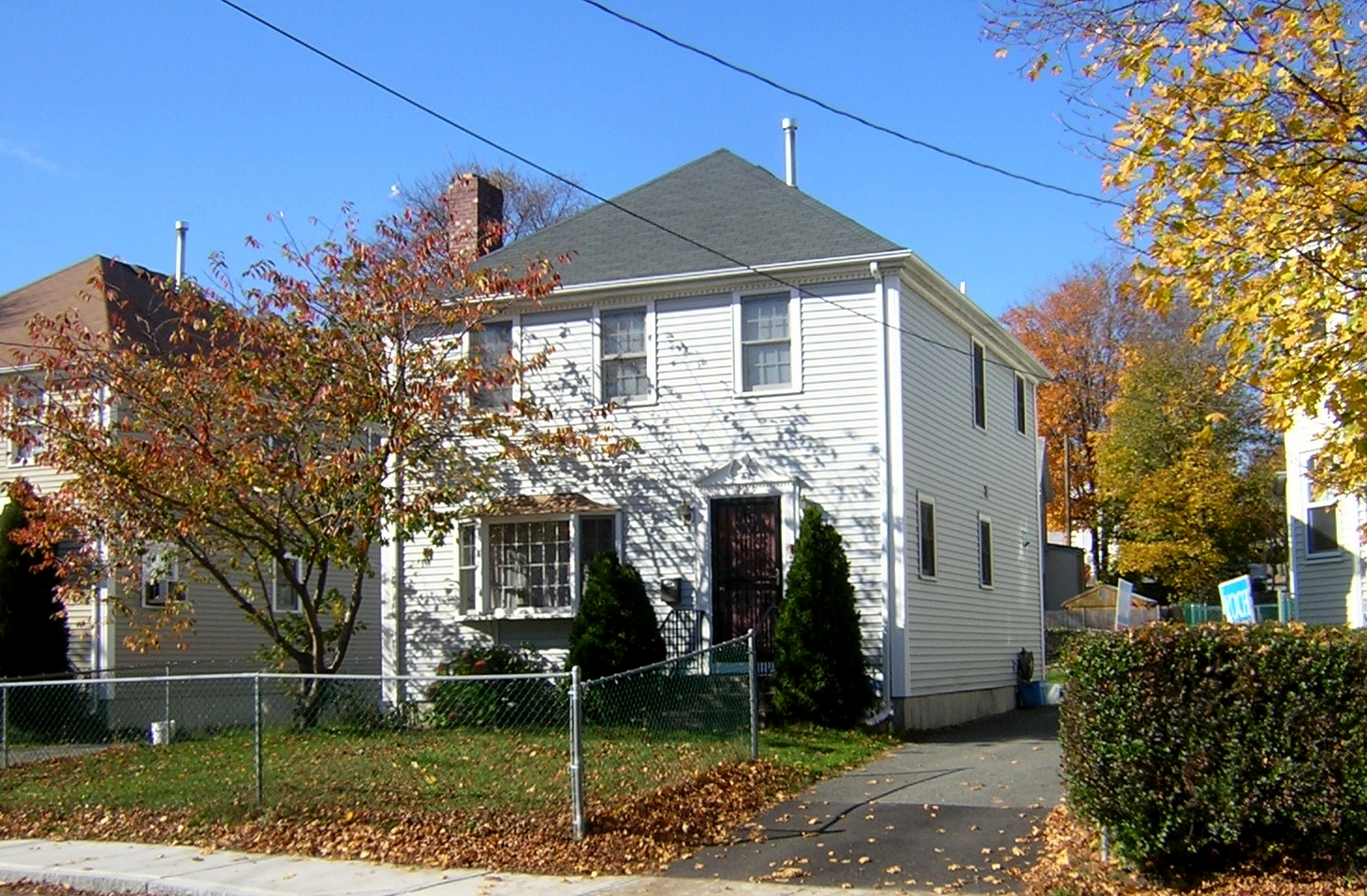
- A likely replacement house on the property where this house stood

- Location within Massachusetts Location within the United States
- Location: 429 Granite St., Quincy, Massachusetts
- Coordinates: 42°14′27.3″N 71°0′58.1″W
- Area: 0.6 acres (0.24 ha)
- Built: 1820; 206 years ago
- Architectural style: Federal
- MPS: Quincy MRA
- NRHP reference No.: 89001342
- Added to NRHP: September 20, 1989

The Solomon Nightengale House (or "Nightingale") was a historic house at 429 Granite Street in Quincy, Massachusetts. The 1 1/2-story Cape style house was built c. 1820 by Solomon Nightengale, whose family had owned the land since the 18th century. It had a four-bay facade, with a central chimney and a sheltered entry in the center-left bay. The house was listed on the National Register of Historic Places in 1989.

The house shown in the image is at the correct address (429 Granite Street) and lot, as verified by reference to the site map provided on the Massachusetts Historical Commission report precedent to its nomination to the National Register. Since it bears little resemblance to the house shown in the Quincy Historical and Architectural Survey, it appears that the 1820 house has been torn down and replaced by the house shown and its identical twin to the left.

== See also ==
- National Register of Historic Places listings in Quincy, Massachusetts
