= Charles Marsh House =

Historic house in Massachusetts, United States

- U.S. National Register of Historic Places
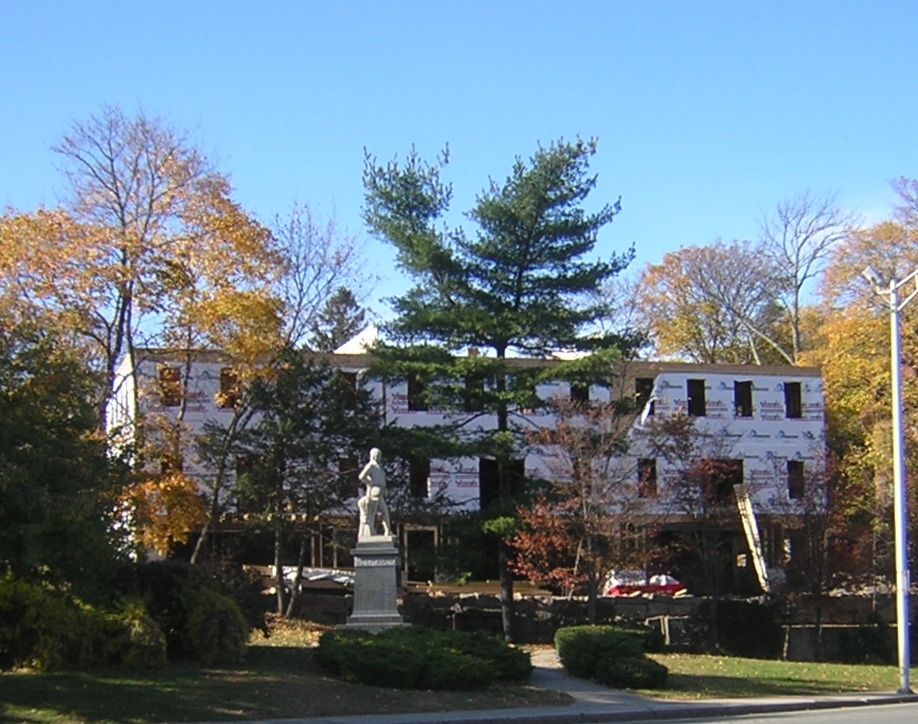
- The site where the Charles Marsh House stood.

- Location within Massachusetts Location within the United States
- Location: 248 President's Ln., Quincy, Massachusetts
- Coordinates: 42°14′55.5″N 71°0′17″W
- Area: 0.4 acres (0.16 ha)
- Built: 1860
- Architectural style: Italianate
- MPS: Quincy MRA
- NRHP reference No.: 89001366
- Added to NRHP: September 20, 1989

The Charles Marsh House was a historic house at 248 President's Lane in Quincy, Massachusetts. The 2 1/2-story wood-frame house was built in the 1860s, and was described as one of the city's finest examples of Italianate styling. It has been demolished around 2009.

Its setting was described as a "Spacious lot adjoining Robert Burns park but close to commercial Granite Street...."

The house was (and remains) listed on the National Register of Historic Places in 1989.

== See also ==
- National Register of Historic Places listings in Quincy, Massachusetts
