= George A. Sidelinger House =

Historic house in Massachusetts, United States

- U.S. National Register of Historic Places
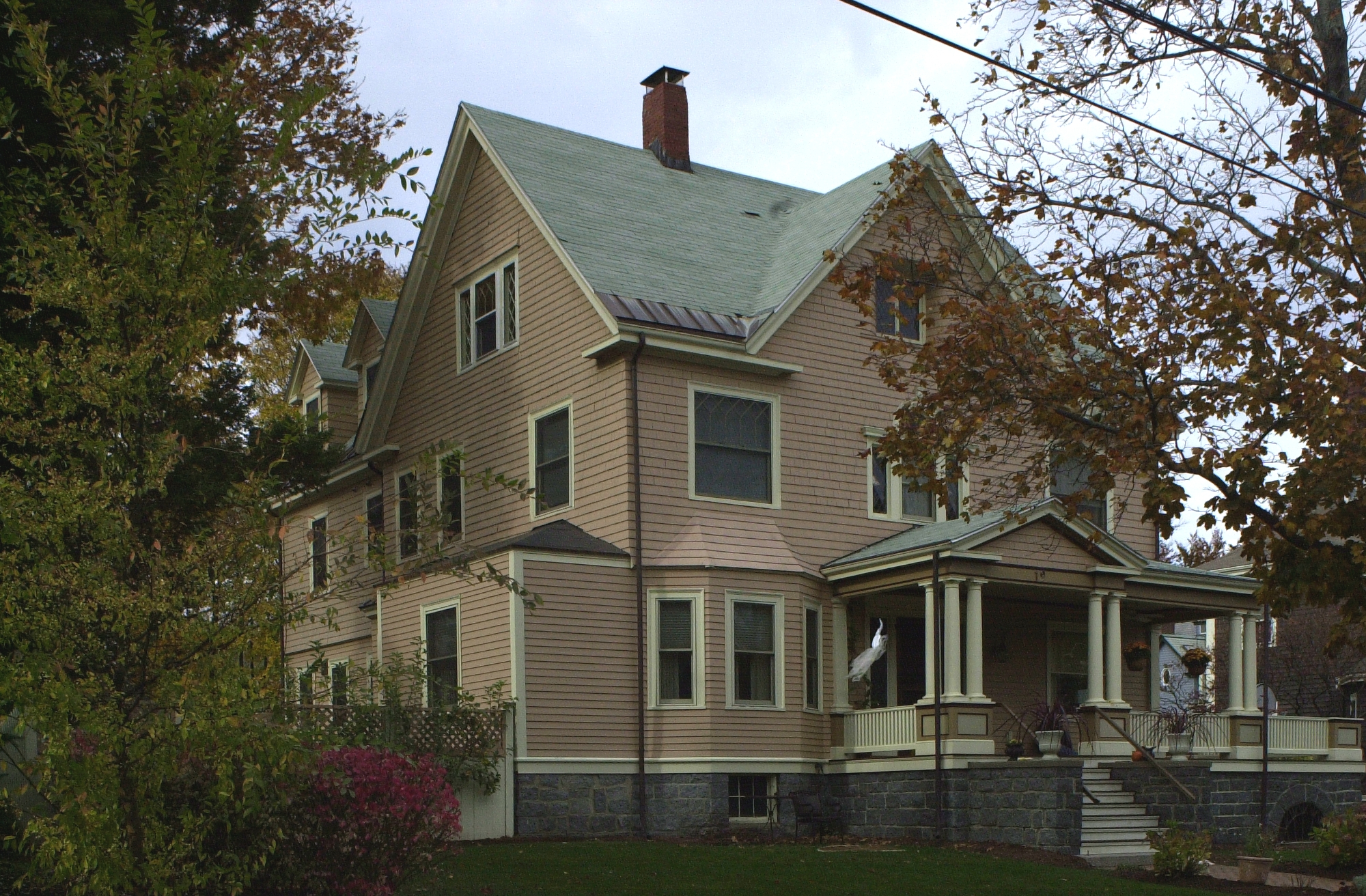

- Location within Massachusetts Location within the United States
- Location: 19 Avon Way, Quincy, Massachusetts
- Coordinates: 42°15′2″N 71°0′28″W
- Area: 0.2 acres (0.081 ha)
- Built: 1904
- Architectural style: Shingle Style
- MPS: Quincy MRA
- NRHP reference No.: 89001313
- Added to NRHP: September 20, 1989

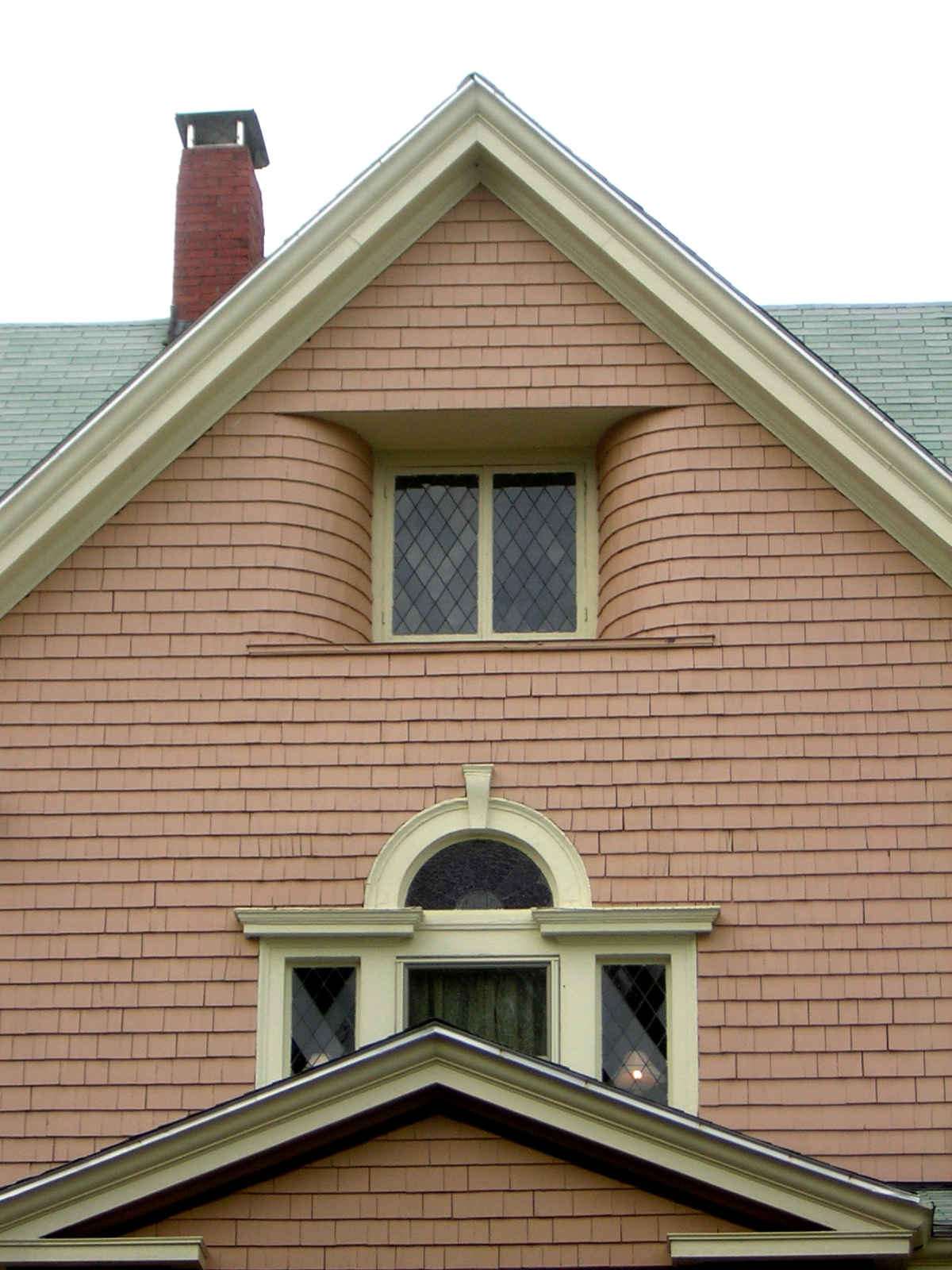

The George A. Sidelinger House is a historic house at 19 Avon Way in Quincy, Massachusetts. The 2 1/2-story wood-frame house was built c. 1904 by George Sidelinger, a local politician. It is one of a small number of well-preserved Shingle style houses on President's Hill. Its three-bay gabled facade has a diamond paned window in a curved recess near the gable peak, and a small Palladian window below. Its porch wraps around to the side, and is supported by clusters of Doric columns, set on piers with a low balustrade between.

The house was listed on the National Register of Historic Places in 1989.

== See also ==
- National Register of Historic Places listings in Quincy, Massachusetts
