= House at 15 Gilmore Street =

Historic house in Massachusetts, United States

- U.S. National Register of Historic Places
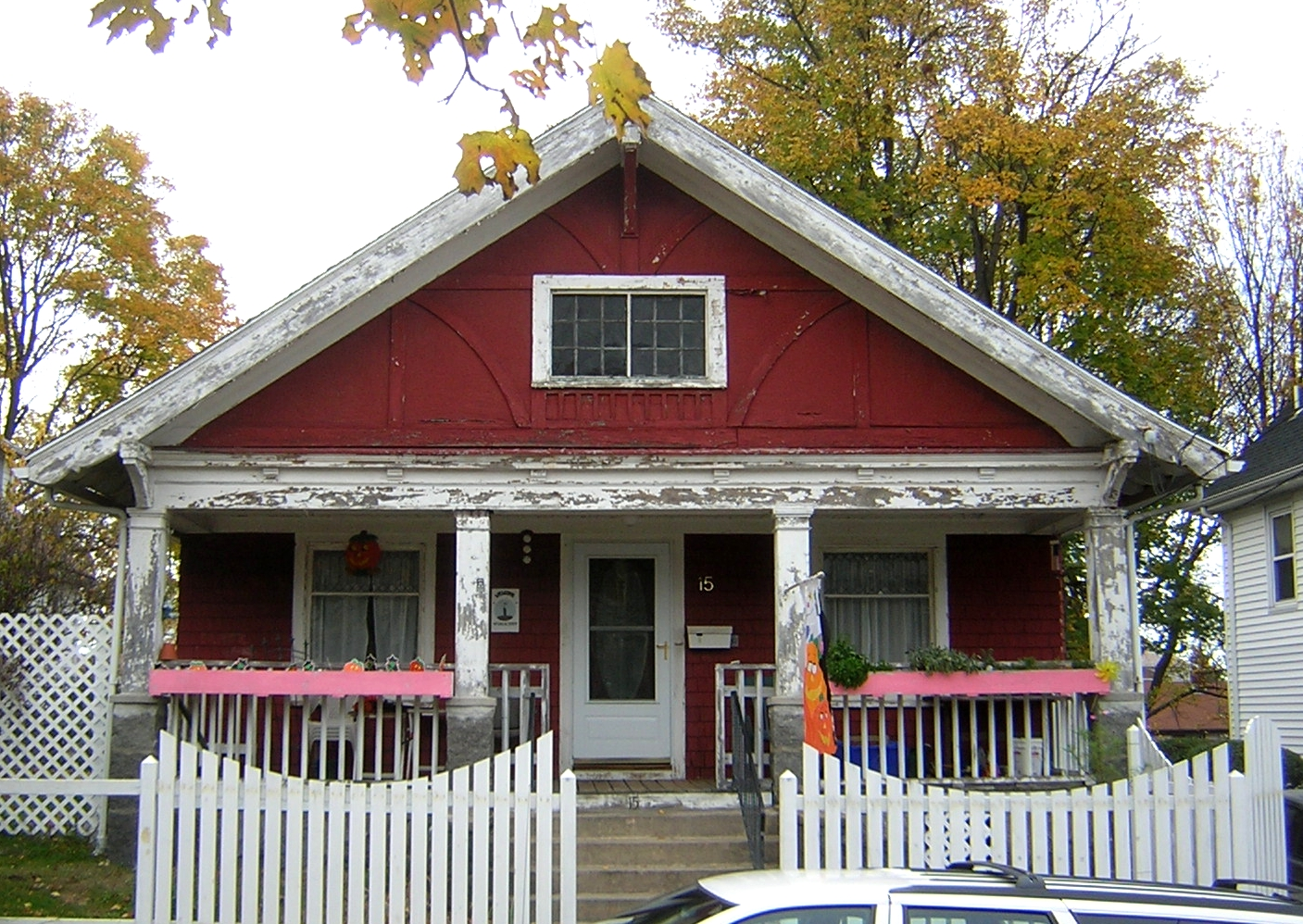

- Location within Massachusetts Location within the United States
- Location: 15 Gilmore St., Quincy, Massachusetts
- Coordinates: 42°15′34.7″N 71°0′38.5″W
- Area: 0.2 acres (0.081 ha)
- Built: 1908
- Architectural style: Bungalow/Craftsman
- MPS: Quincy MRA
- NRHP reference No.: 89001336
- Added to NRHP: September 20, 1989

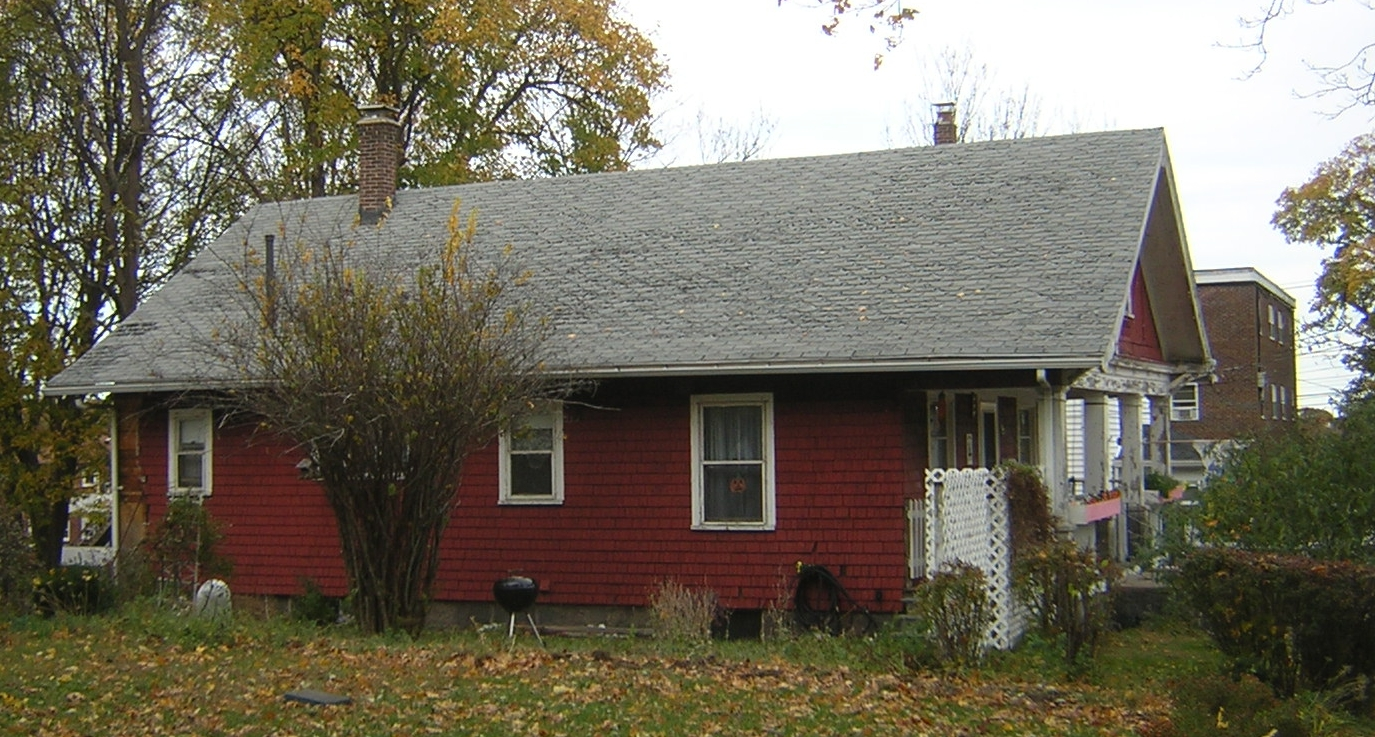

The House at 15 Gilmore Street in Quincy, Massachusetts, (torn down and renovated in 2023) was previously a well-preserved Craftsman bungalow. The 1 1/2-story wood-frame house was built in 1908 by Albert Nelson, the builder who developed Gilmore Street in response to the arrival of the railroad in the area in the 1880s. The front-gable house has extended eaves with exposed rafters along the sides, and the front gable projects over the porch, which is supported by thick square pillars on granite posts.

The house was listed on the National Register of Historic Places in 1989.

== See also ==
- National Register of Historic Places listings in Quincy, Massachusetts
