= Russell M. Dicey House =

Historic house in Massachusetts, United States

- U.S. National Register of Historic Places
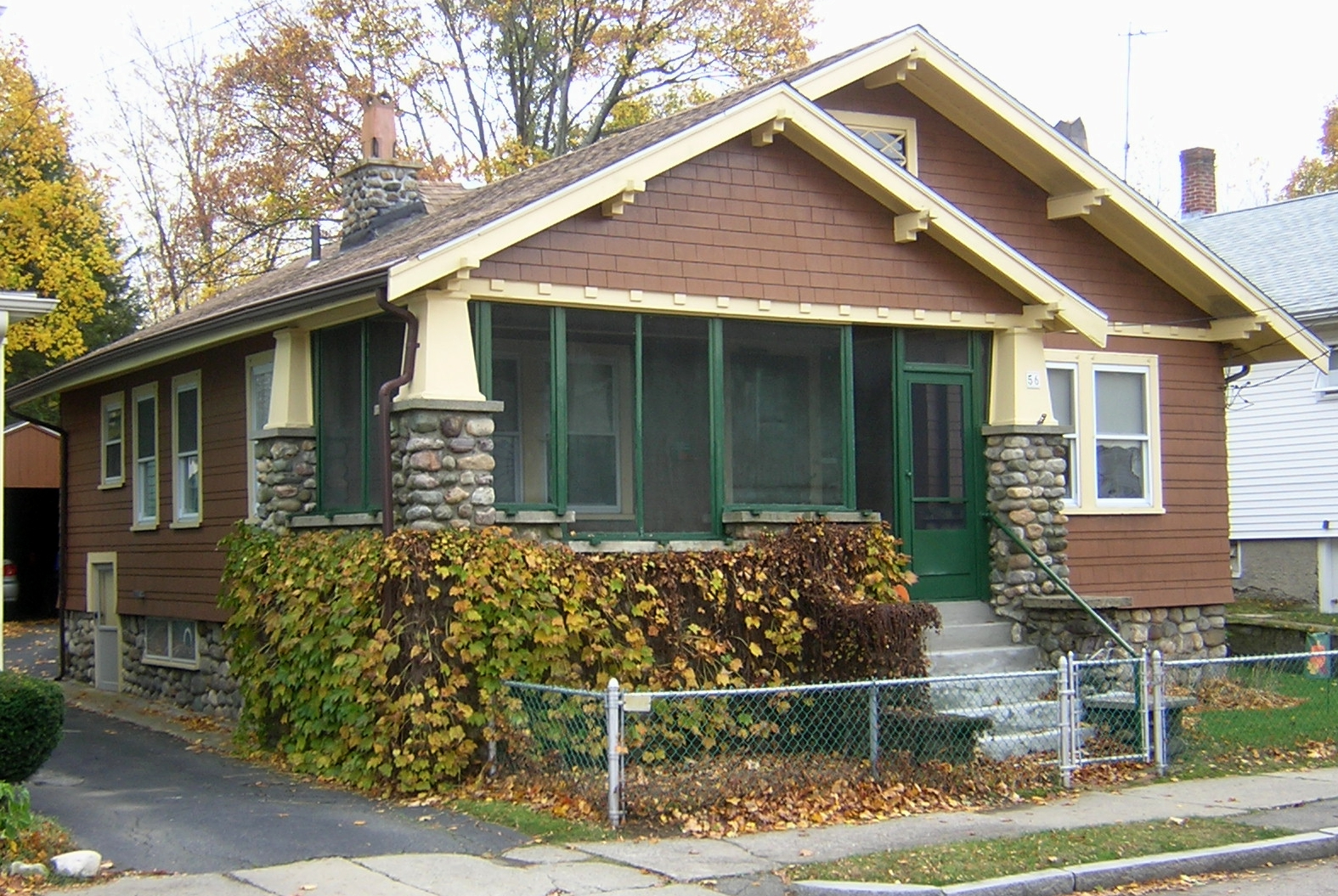

- Location within Massachusetts Location within the United States
- Location: 56 Pope St., Quincy, Massachusetts
- Coordinates: 42°16′12.3″N 71°2′12.9″W
- Area: 0.1 acres (0.040 ha)
- Built: 1918
- Architectural style: Bungalow/Craftsman
- MPS: Quincy MRA
- NRHP reference No.: 89001363
- Added to NRHP: September 20, 1989

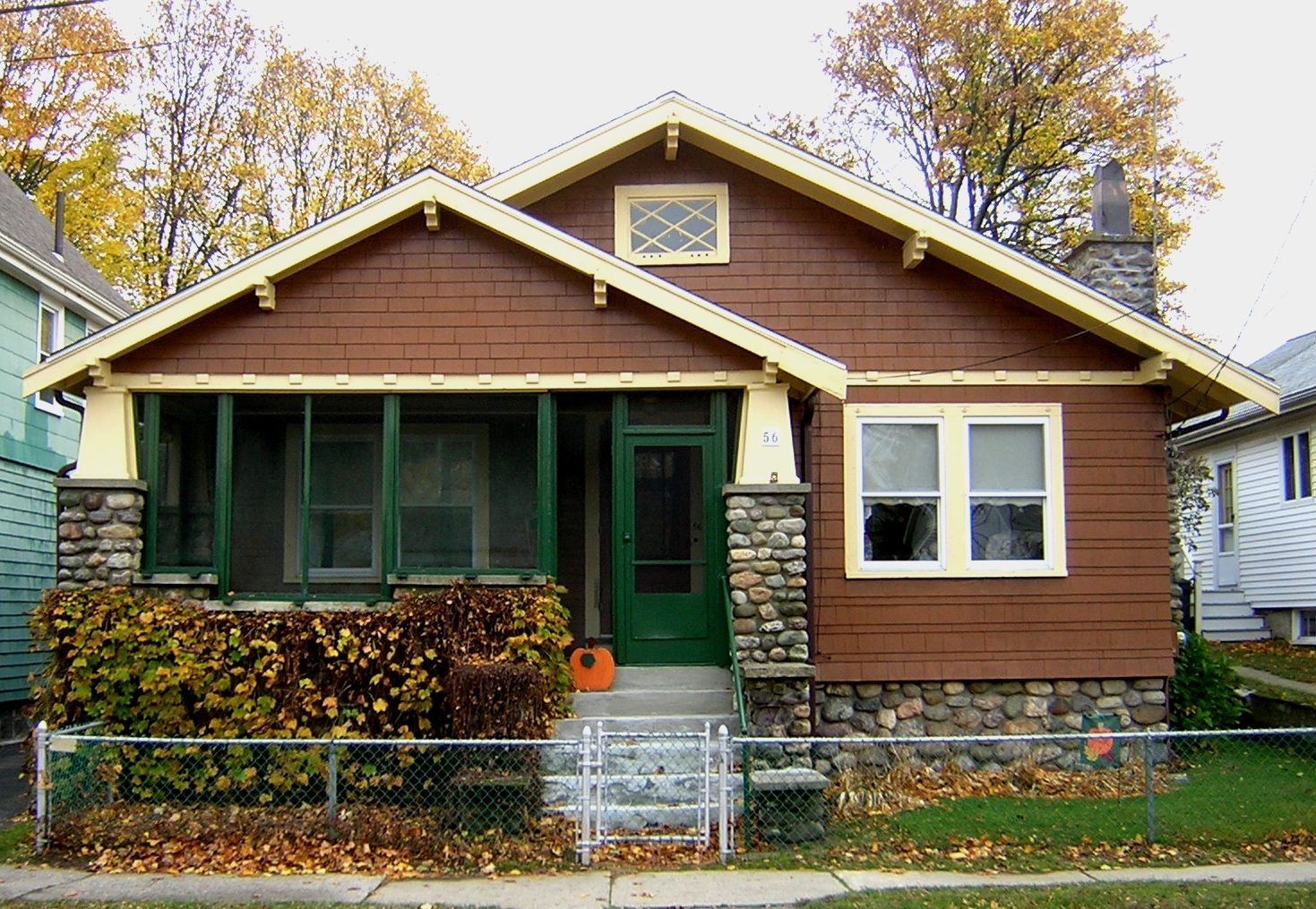

The Russell M. Dicey House is a historic house at 56 Pope Street in Quincy, Massachusetts. The 1 1/2-story wood-frame house was built in 1918, and is a well-preserved example of a modest Craftsman bungalow. It has the extended eaves with brackets typical of the style, as well as a fieldstone porch with tapered square posts. Russell Dicey was a local contractor who lived here for several years, selling the house in 1927.

The house was listed on the National Register of Historic Places in 1989.

== See also ==
- National Register of Historic Places listings in Quincy, Massachusetts
