= John Halloran House =

Historic house in Massachusetts, United States

- U.S. National Register of Historic Places
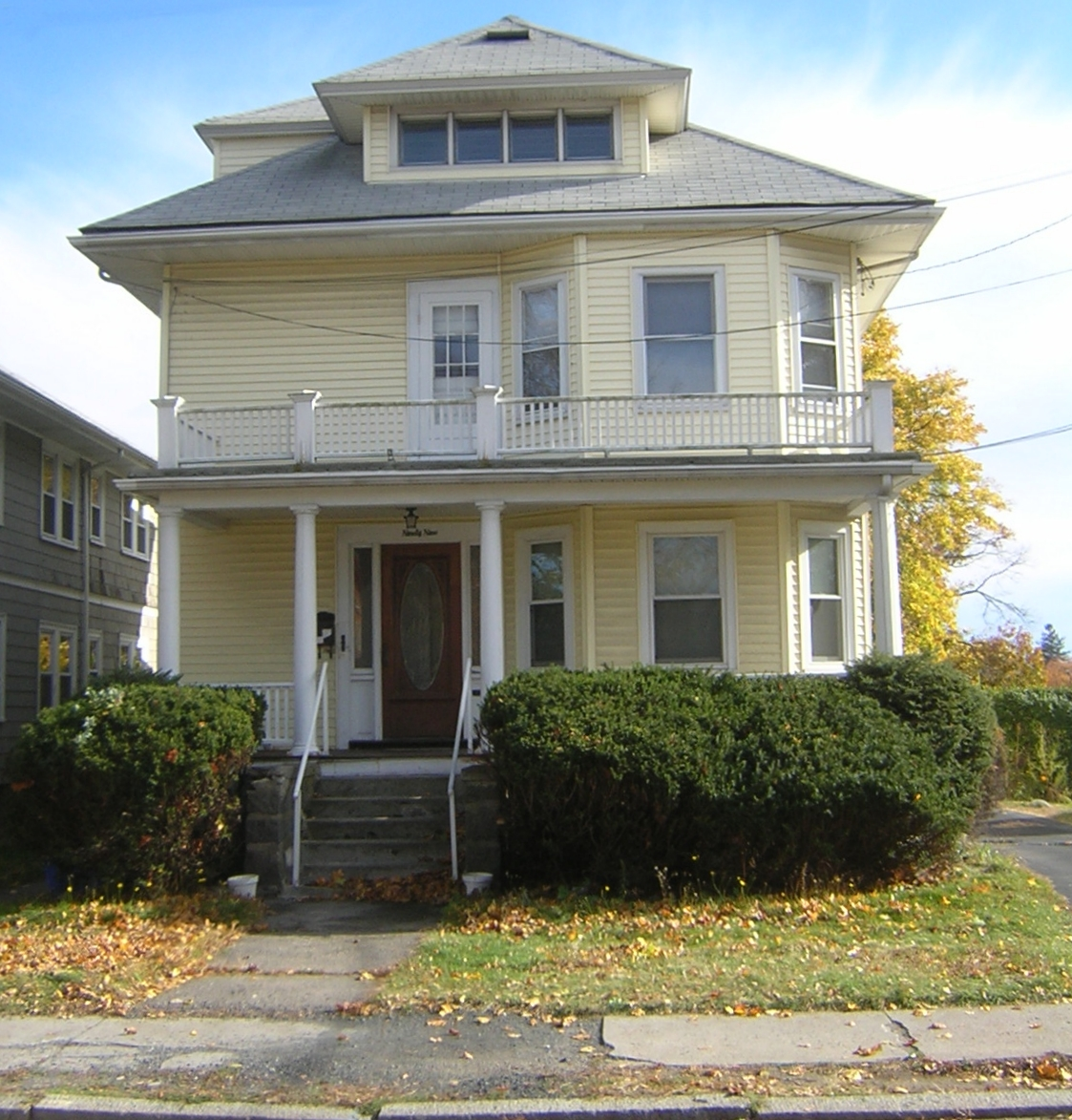

- Location within Massachusetts Location within the United States
- Location: 99 E. Squantum St., Quincy, Massachusetts
- Coordinates: 42°16′44″N 71°1′34″W
- Area: 0.1 acres (0.040 ha)
- Built: 1910
- Architectural style: Colonial Revival, American Four-Square
- MPS: Quincy MRA
- NRHP reference No.: 89001327
- Added to NRHP: September 20, 1989

The John Halloran House is a historic house at 99 E. Squantum Street in Quincy, Massachusetts. This two-family wood-frame house was built in 1910 for John Halloran, a local police officer. It is a well-preserved Colonial Revival example of duplexes that were commonly built in the Atlantic neighborhood of Quincy, with a fine balustraded porch, and an entrance with long sidelight windows and oval window in the door. Bay windows project on the right side of the front, and a low hip-roof dormer projects from the roof.

The house was listed on the National Register of Historic Places in 1989.

== See also ==
- National Register of Historic Places listings in Quincy, Massachusetts
