= William R. Bateman House =

Historic house in Massachusetts, United States

- U.S. National Register of Historic Places
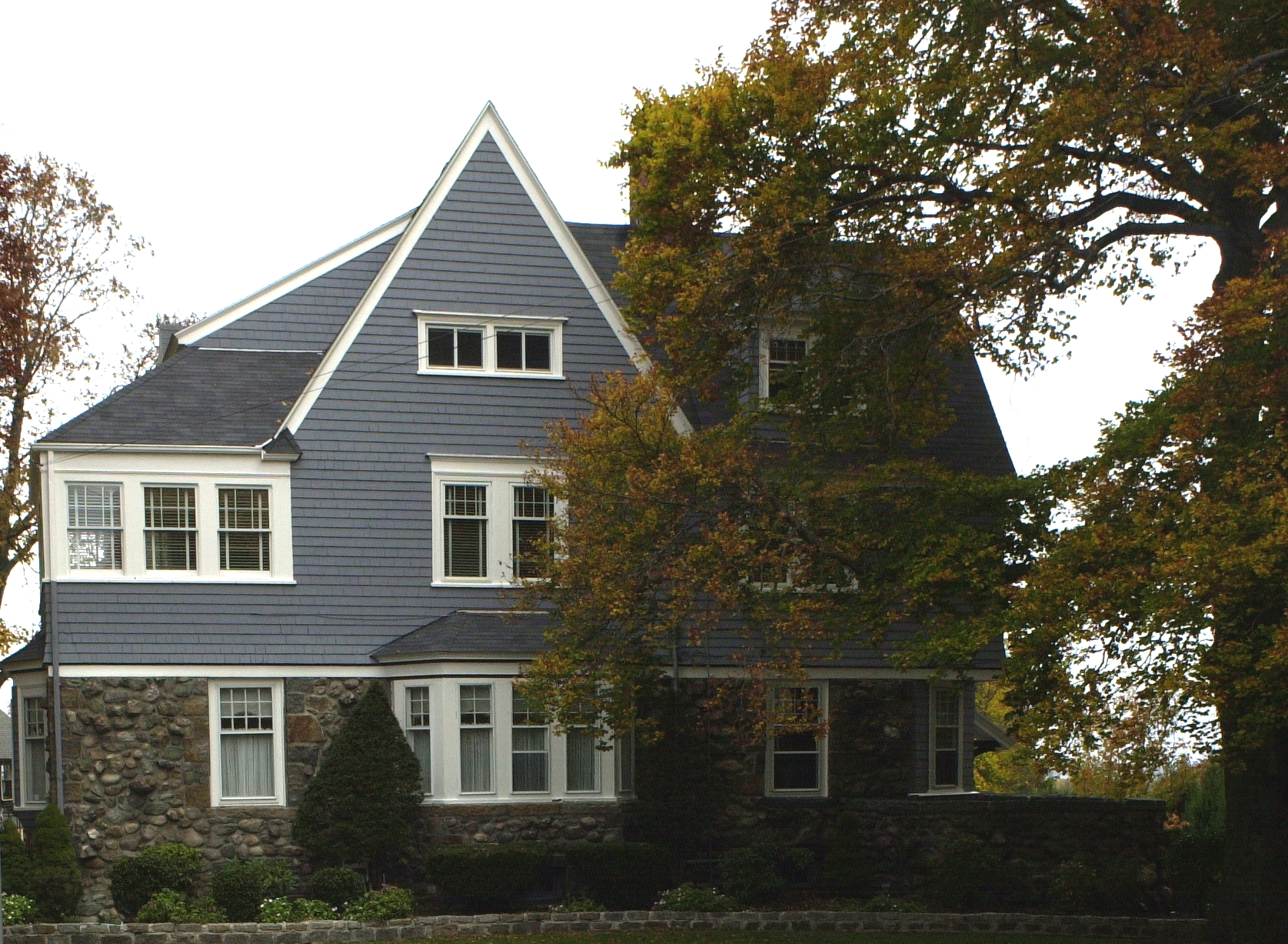

- Location within Massachusetts Location within the United States
- Location: 148 Monroe Rd., Quincy, Massachusetts
- Coordinates: 42°15′6″N 71°0′30.3″W
- Built: 1890
- Architectural style: Queen Anne
- MPS: Quincy MRA
- NRHP reference No.: 89001359
- Added to NRHP: September 20, 1989

The William R. Bateman House is a historic house located at 148 Monroe Road in Quincy, Massachusetts.

== Description and history ==
The 2 1/2-story, wood-framed house was built in the 1890s for William Bateman, Boston-based wool dealer. The large Queen Anne style house is located in President's Hill, at that time a fashionable neighborhood for upper-class local and Boston businessmen. The house as a complex roofline and massing, and its first floor and porch are built out of fieldstone, a rare use of the material in the area.

The house was listed on the National Register of Historic Places on September 20, 1989.

== See also ==
- National Register of Historic Places listings in Quincy, Massachusetts
