= Charles E. White House =

Historic house in Massachusetts, United States

- U.S. National Register of Historic Places
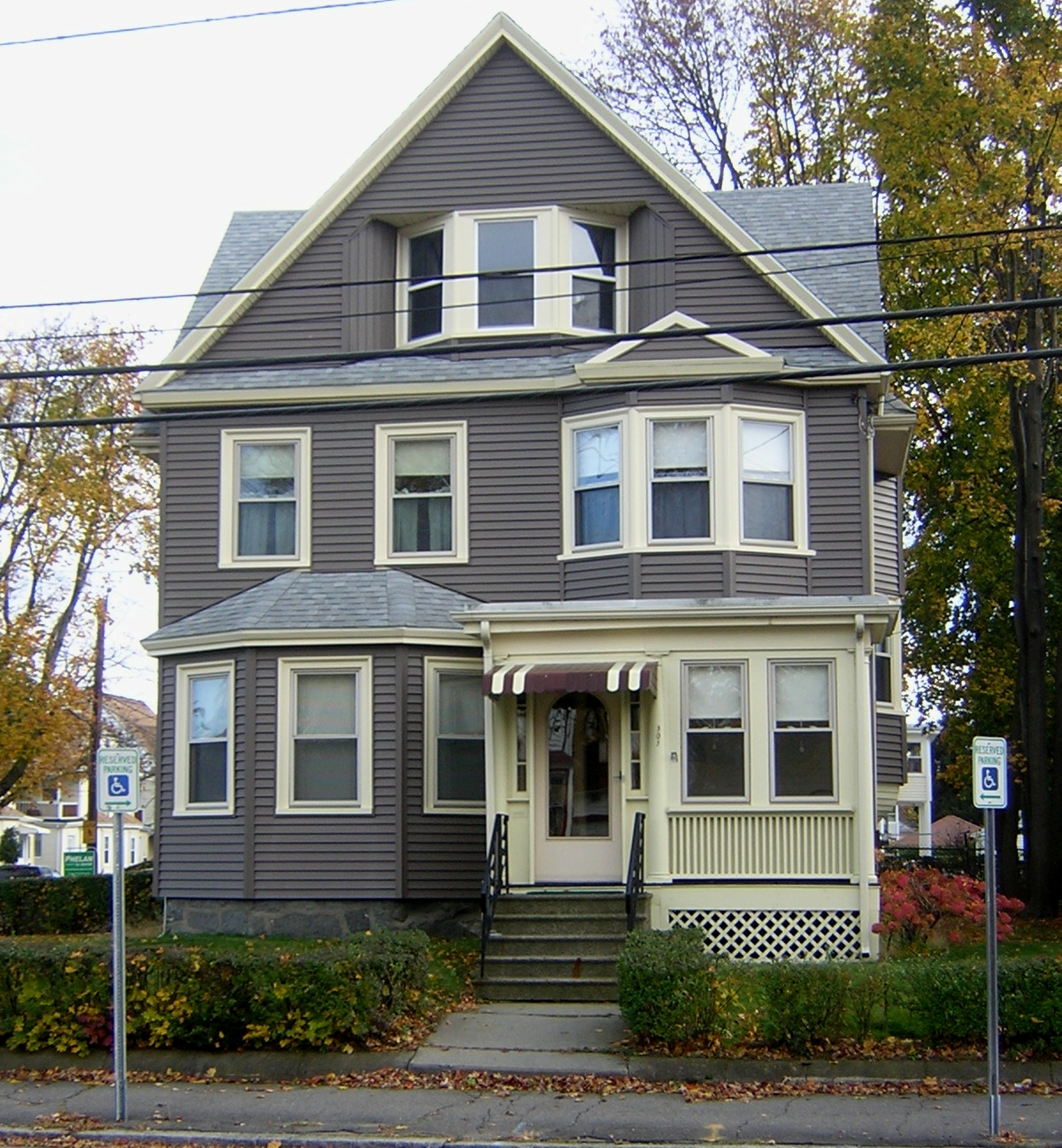

- Location within Massachusetts Location within the United States
- Location: 101 Billings Rd., Quincy, Massachusetts
- Coordinates: 42°16′29″N 71°1′22.5″W
- Area: 0.1 acres (0.040 ha)
- Built: 1905
- Architectural style: Shingle Style
- MPS: Quincy MRA
- NRHP reference No.: 89001320
- Added to NRHP: September 20, 1989

The Charles E. White House is a historic house at 101 Billings Road in Quincy, Massachusetts. This 2 1/2-story wood-frame house was built c. 1905 by Charles White, a traveling salesman. It is a well-preserved local example of late Shingle styling, with a cross-gable roof configuration and a side-hall entry plan. It has a number of projecting bay windows, and a gable window set in a curved recess. Its original shingling has been either covered or replaced by modern siding (see photo).

The house was listed on the National Register of Historic Places in 1989.

== See also ==
- National Register of Historic Places listings in Quincy, Massachusetts
