= House at 92 Willard Street =

Historic house in Massachusetts, United States

- U.S. National Register of Historic Places
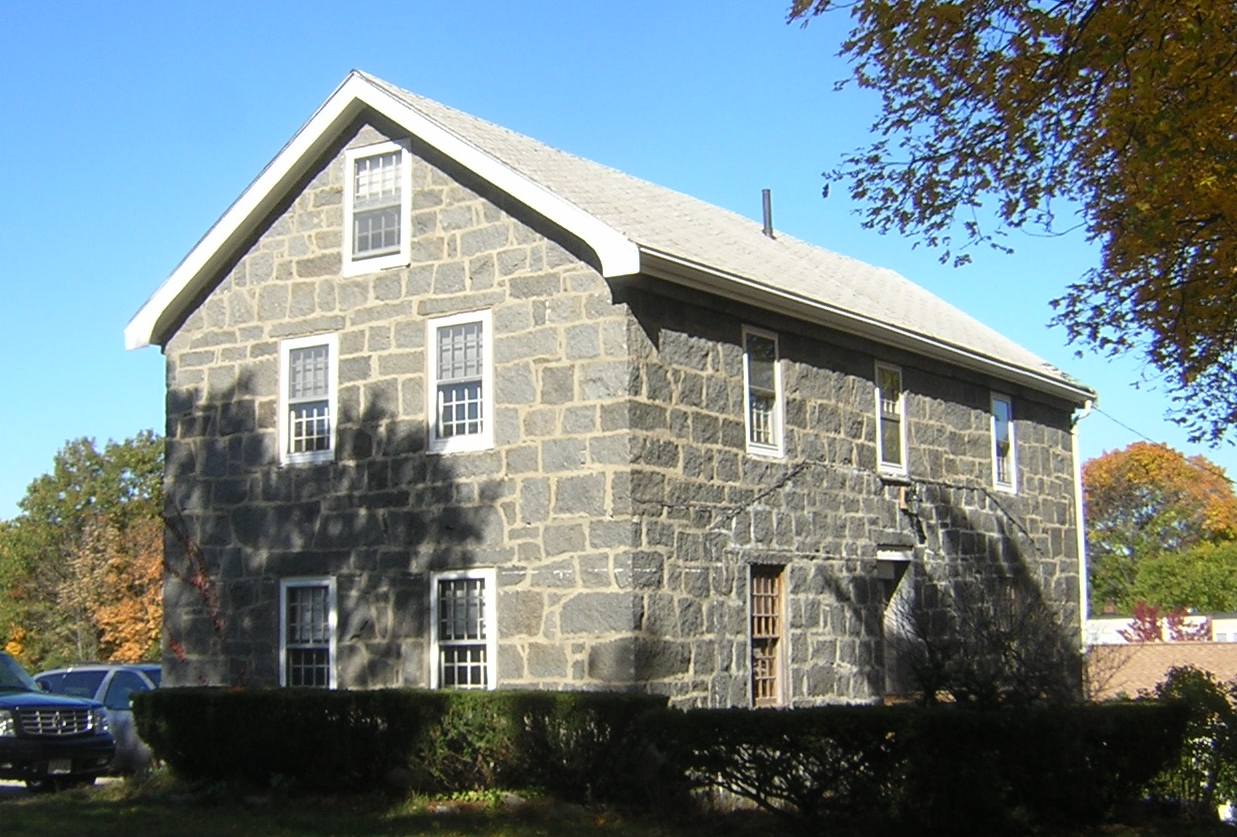

- Location within Massachusetts Location within the United States
- Location: 92 Willard St., Quincy, Massachusetts
- Coordinates: 42°15′7″N 71°2′12″W
- Built: 1830
- Architectural style: Federal
- MPS: Quincy MRA
- NRHP reference No.: 89001383
- Added to NRHP: September 20, 1989

The House at 92 Willard Street in Quincy, Massachusetts, is believed to be the only granite house ever built in the city, which is well known for its granite quarries. The house is located in West Quincy, near its famous granite quarries, and was built in the 1830s. It is a 2 1/2-story structure, fashioned out of granite blocks, with a gable roof. A single-story hip-roofed porch once wrapped around two sides; it was an early 20th-century addition that has since been removed. The main facade is three bays wide, with the entrance at the center.

The house was listed on the National Register of Historic Places in 1989.

== Gallery ==
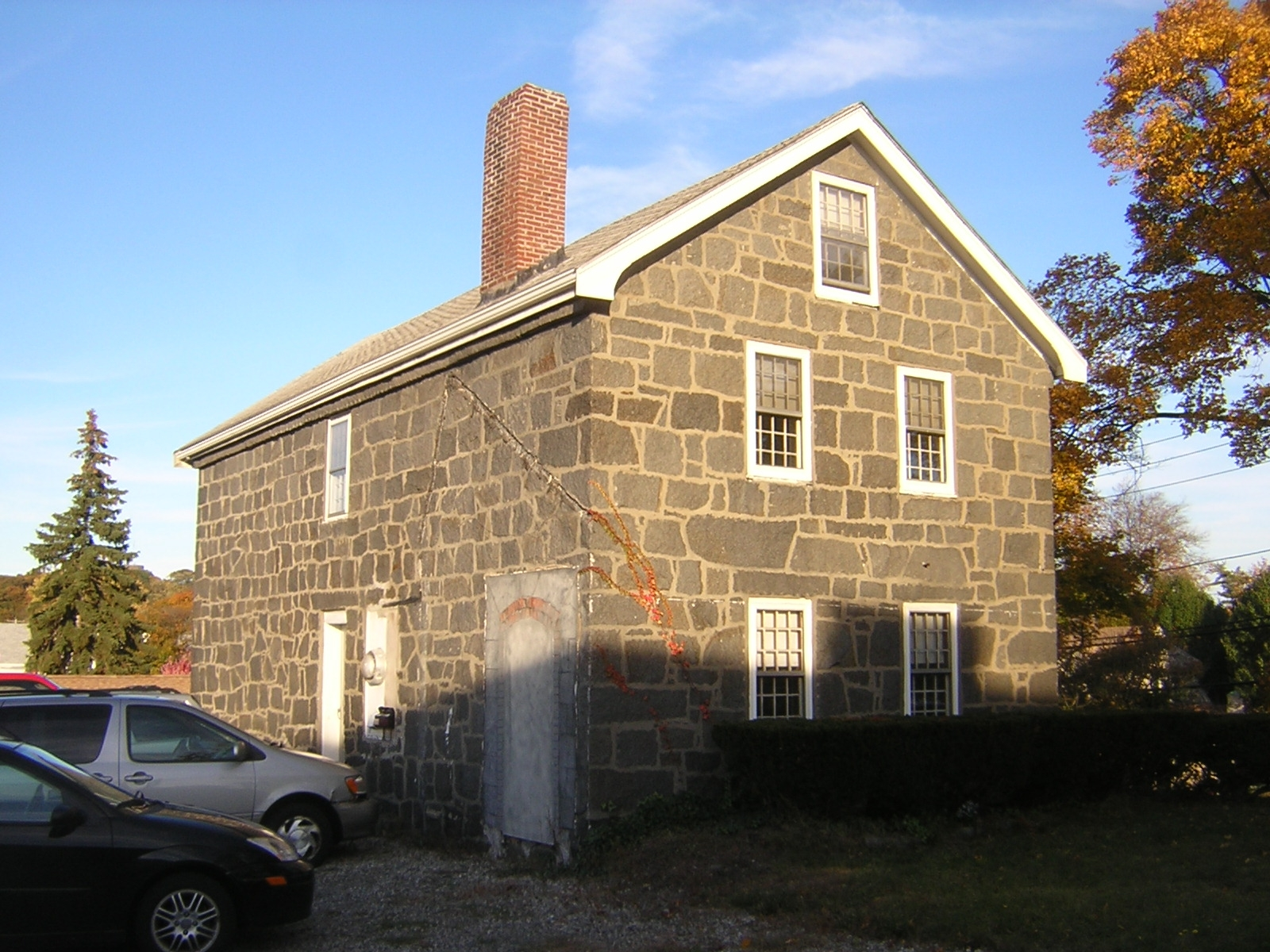

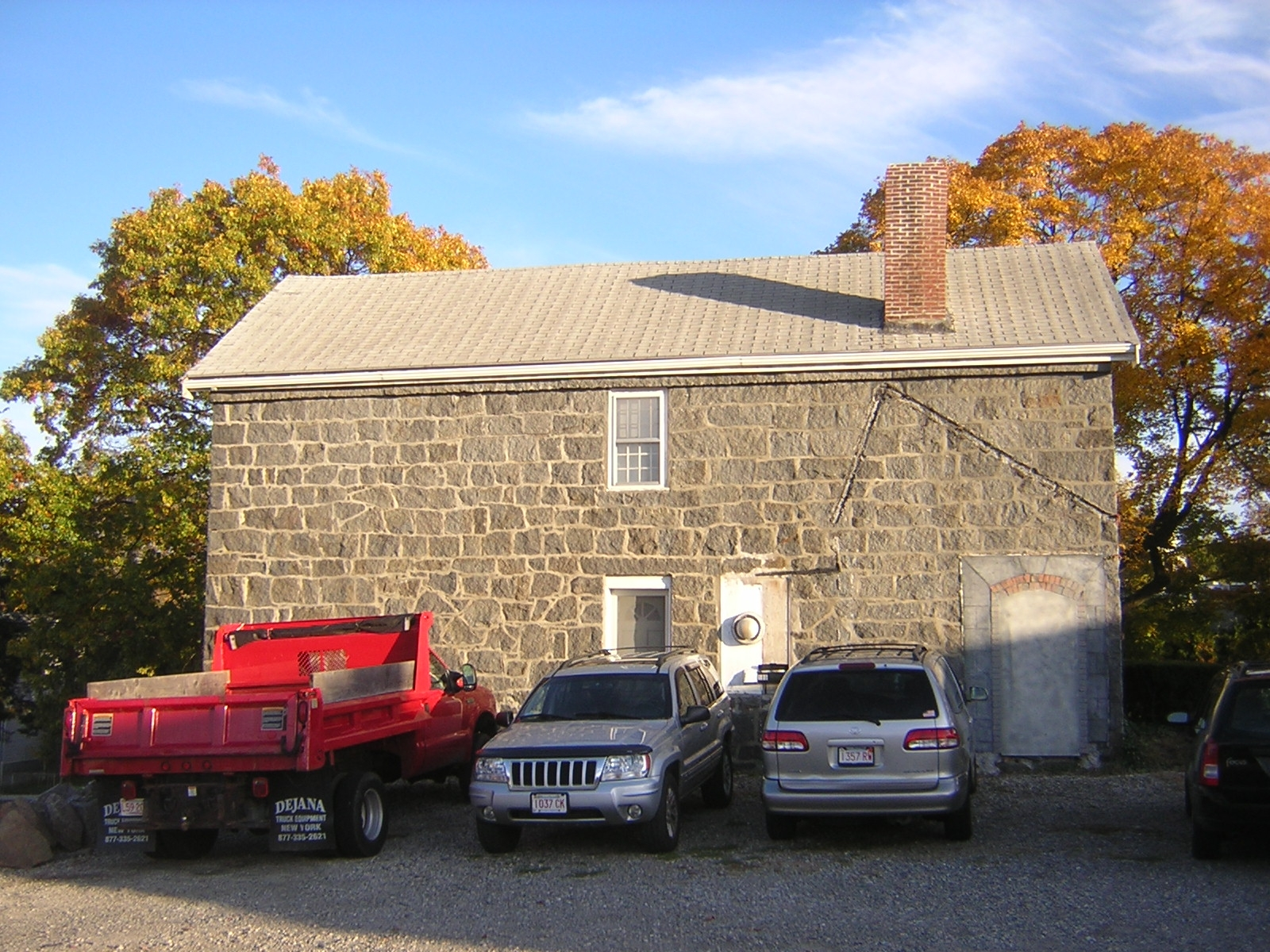

== See also ==
- National Register of Historic Places listings in Quincy, Massachusetts
