= House at 32 Bayview Avenue =

Historic house in Massachusetts, United States

- U.S. National Register of Historic Places
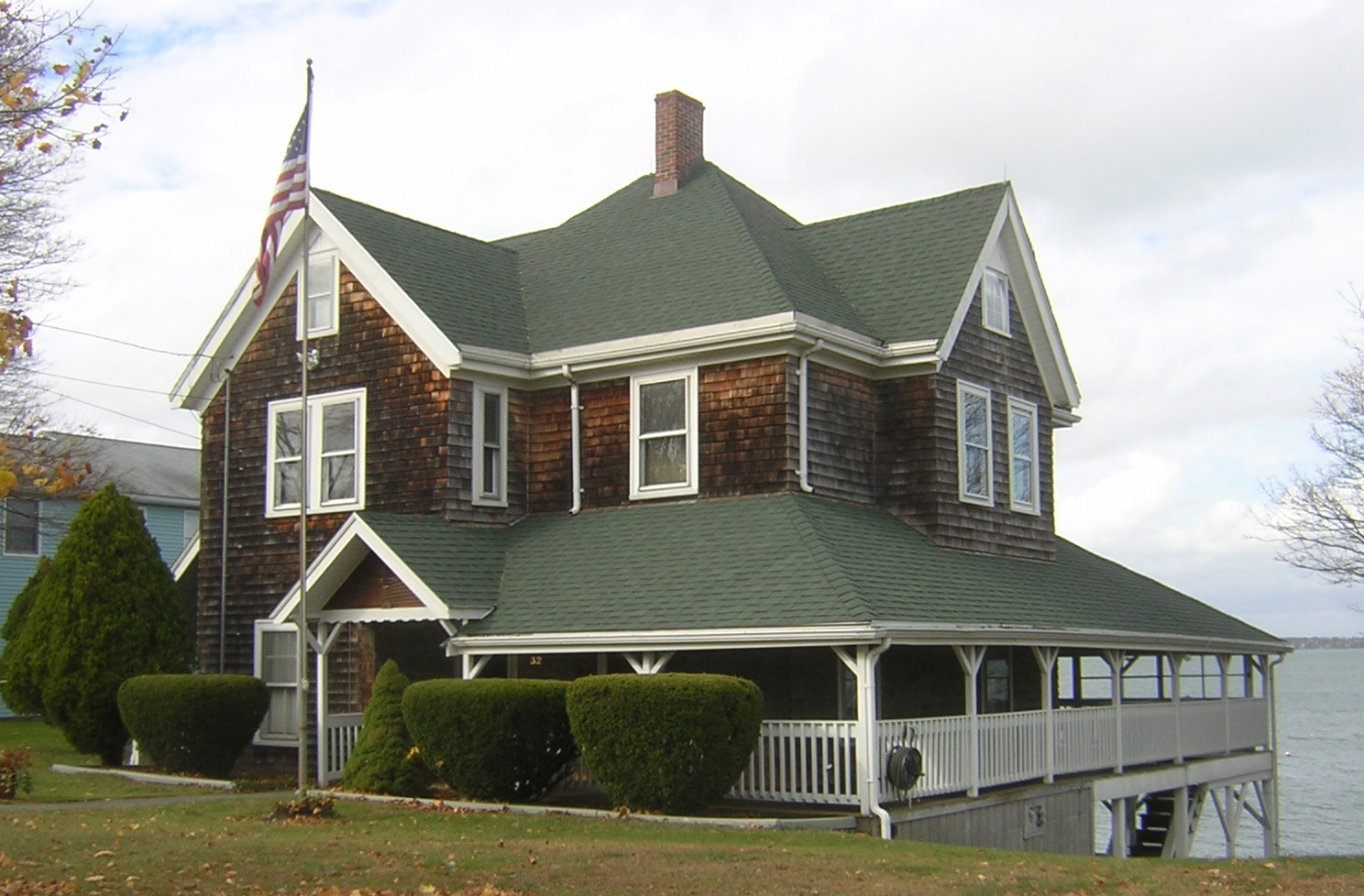

- Location within Massachusetts Location within the United States
- Location: 32 Bayview Ave., Quincy, Massachusetts
- Coordinates: 42°16′17″N 70°57′18.5″W
- Area: 0.4 acres (0.16 ha)
- Built: 1880
- Architectural style: Queen Anne
- MPS: Quincy MRA
- NRHP reference No.: 89001314
- Added to NRHP: September 20, 1989

The House at 32 Bayview Avenue in Quincy, Massachusetts, is a modest Queen Anne style house built on the shore during Quincy's development of that area as a summer resort area. It was built in the 1880s, sited to take advantage of the views of the Town River to the north. It features relatively modest stylistic details, including varying gable sizes with bargeboard, and a wraparound porch with square posts and some Stick style woodwork.

The house was listed on the National Register of Historic Places in 1989.

== Gallery ==
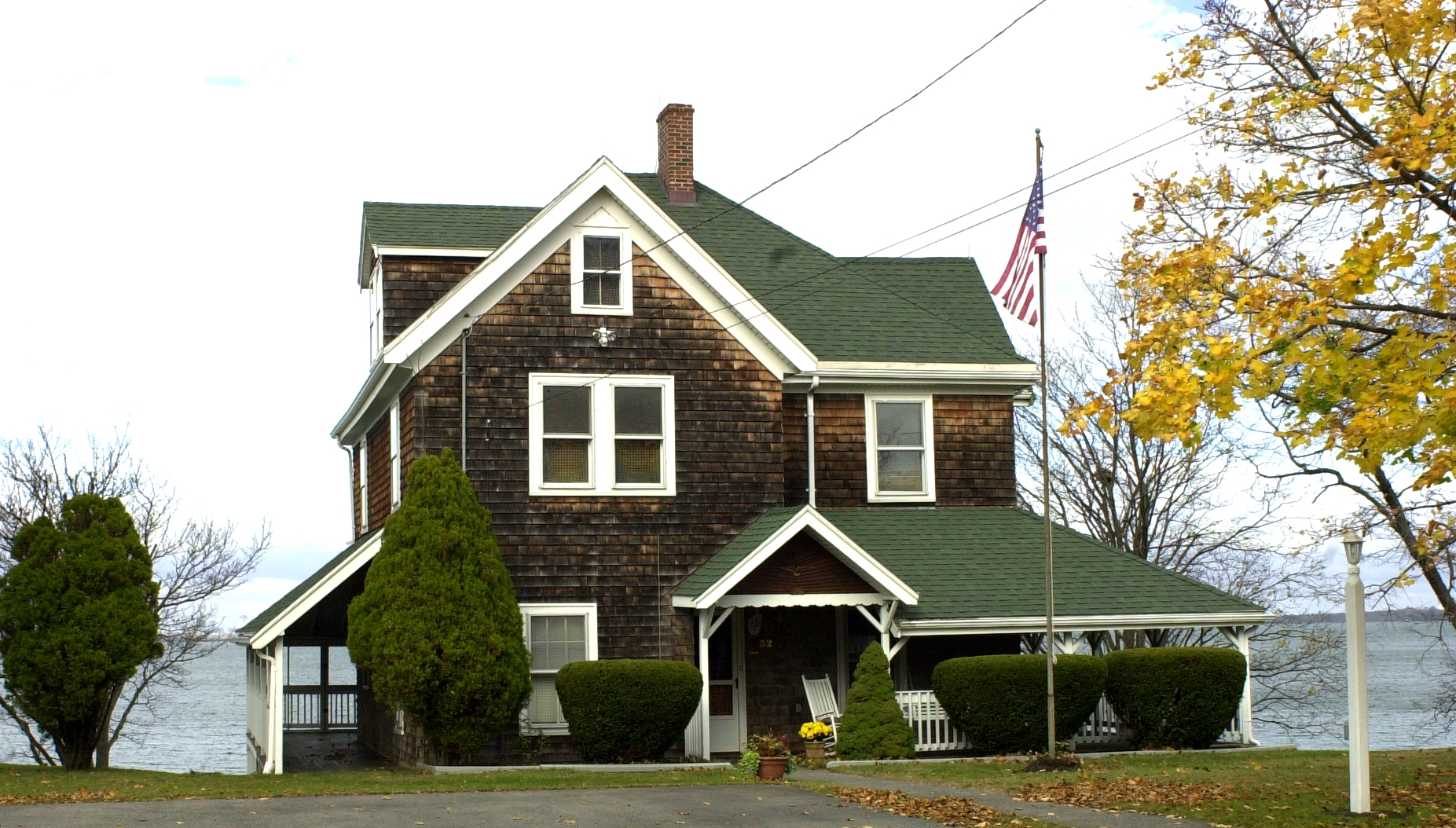

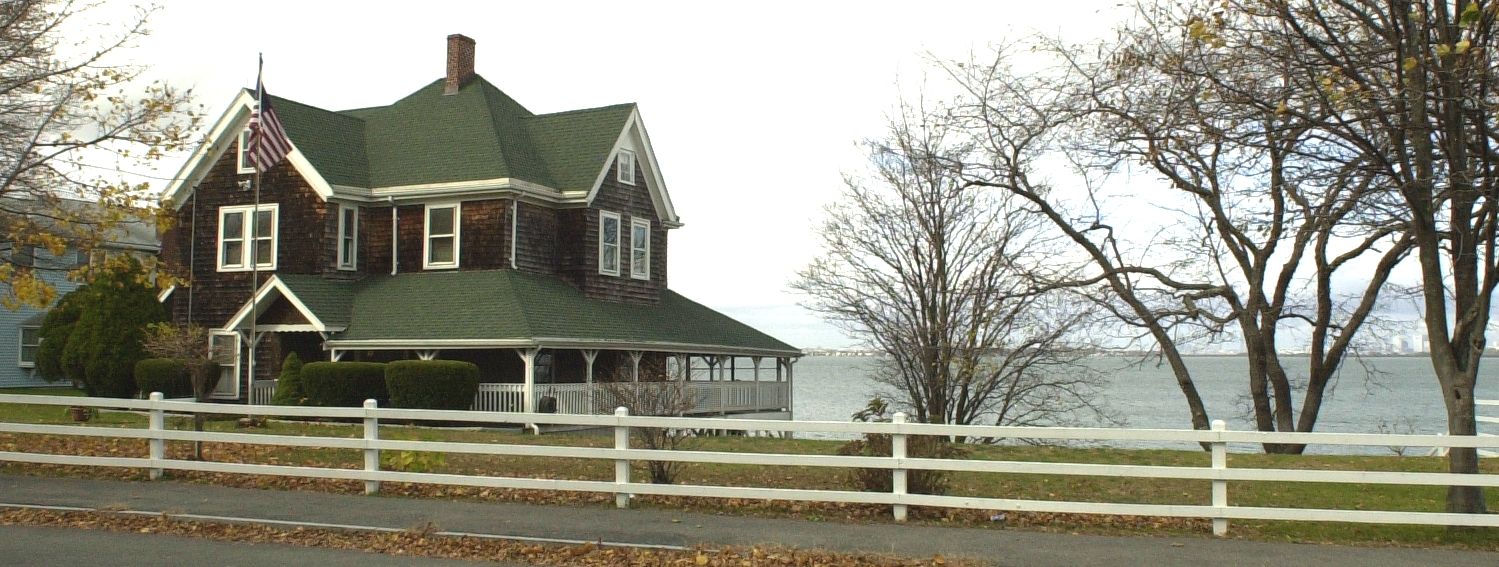
The Boston skyline is visible through the trees at the right.

== See also ==
- National Register of Historic Places listings in Quincy, Massachusetts
