= House at 23–25 Prout Street =

Historic house in Massachusetts, United States

- U.S. National Register of Historic Places
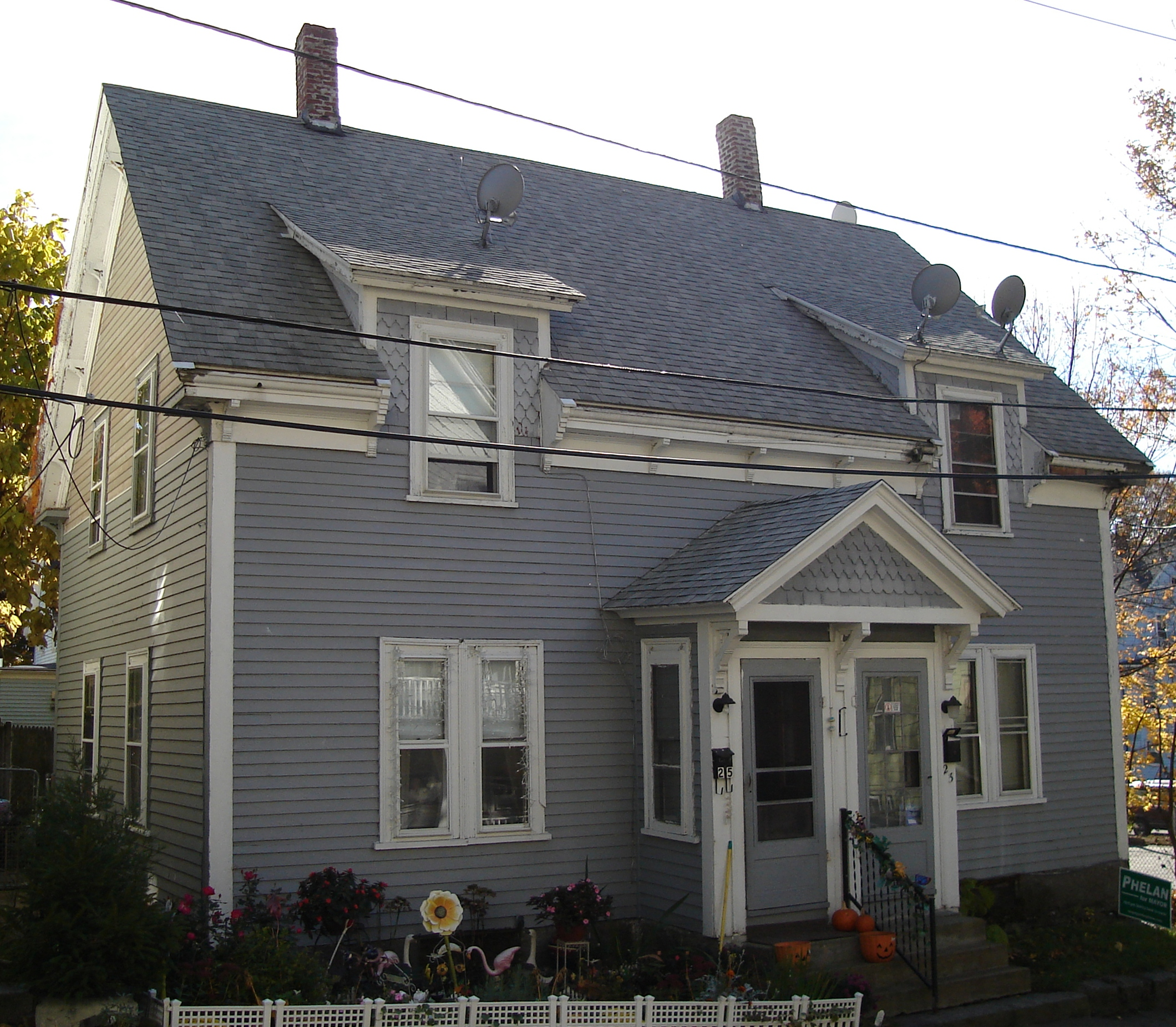

- Location within Massachusetts Location within the United States
- Location: 23–25 Prout St., Quincy, Massachusetts
- Coordinates: 42°14′37″N 71°0′56″W
- Built: 1880
- Architectural style: Quincy Cottage
- MPS: Quincy MRA
- NRHP reference No.: 89001367
- Added to NRHP: September 20, 1989

The House at 23–25 Prout Street in Quincy, Massachusetts, is a well-preserved local example of worker housing for people employed in the local granite industry. A fine example of a "Quincy Cottage", it is a 1 1/2-story wood-frame structure with clapboard siding and a side-gable roof. It has a projecting gabled entrance vestibule, and twin shed-roof wall dormers, both of which are detailed with decorative wooden shingles. The front roof eave has Italianate brackets. This house was built by Barnabas Clark, a major investor in the granite quarries, to house workers.

The house was listed on the National Register of Historic Places in 1989.

== See also ==
- National Register of Historic Places listings in Quincy, Massachusetts
