= House at 25 High School Avenue =

Historic house in Massachusetts, United States

- U.S. National Register of Historic Places
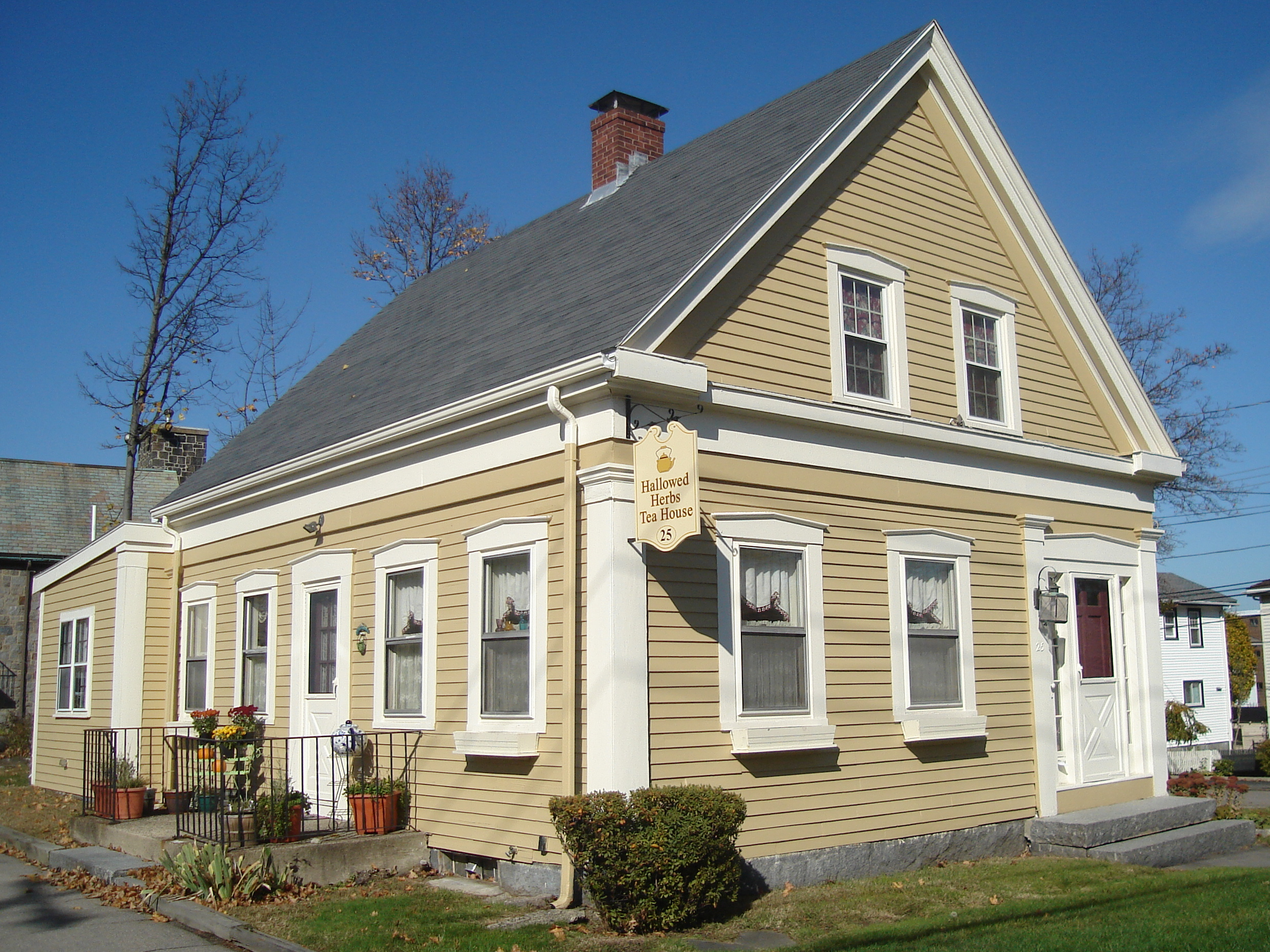
- House at 25 High School Avenue

- Location within Massachusetts Location within the United States
- Location: 25 High School Ave., Quincy, Massachusetts
- Coordinates: 42°14′43″N 70°59′58″W
- Built: 1850
- Architectural style: Greek Revival
- MPS: Quincy MRA
- NRHP reference No.: 89001352
- Added to NRHP: September 20, 1989

The House at 25 High School Avenue in Quincy, Massachusetts, is one of the city's best-preserved Greek Revival cottages. This 1 1/2-story wood-frame house was built in the 1850s; it has a typical side-hall plan, with a front gable roof, clapboard siding, and granite foundation. It has corner pilasters, a fully pedimented gable end, and pedimented gables in its dormers. This type of house was once quite common in the city. It was owned by members of the Perry family until the 1910s.

The house was listed on the National Register of Historic Places in 1989.

== See also ==
- National Register of Historic Places listings in Quincy, Massachusetts
