= Sterling Middle School =

Sterling Middle School may refer to:

- Sterling Middle School (Quincy, Massachusetts)
- Ross Sterling Middle School in Humble, Texas
- Sterling Middle School (Sterling, Virginia)
