= Shepard & Stearns =

American architecture partnership

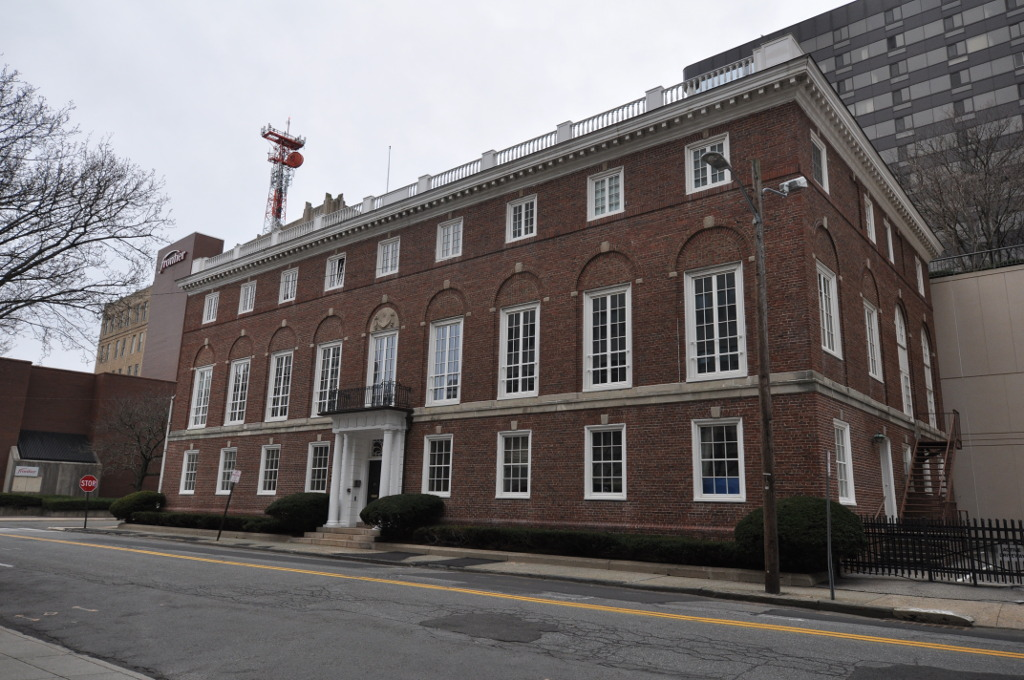
The Suburban Club in Stamford, Connecticut, designed by Stearns, with Shepard as associate architect, in the Federal Revival style and completed in 1914

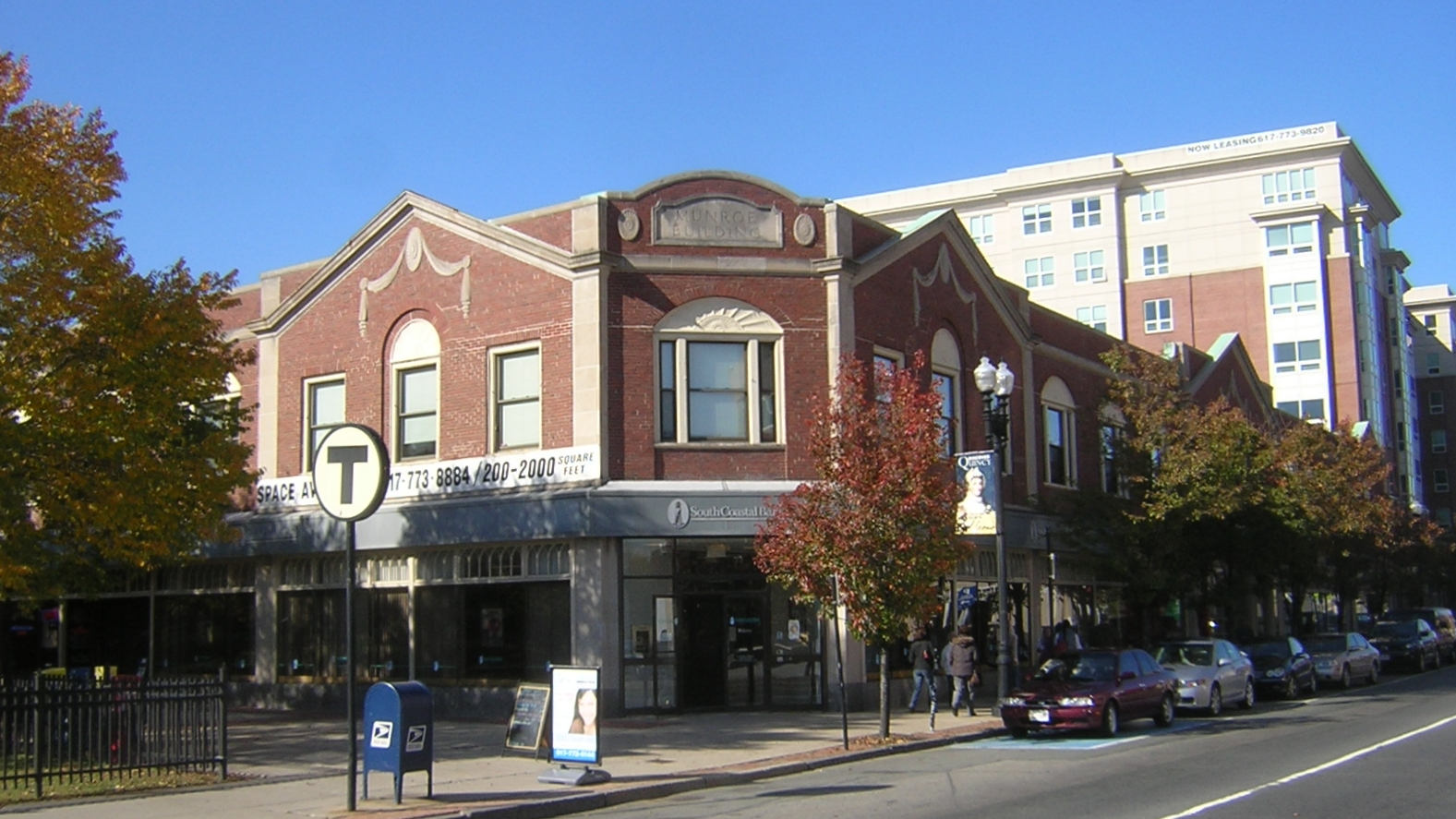
The Munroe Building in Quincy, designed in the Colonial Revival style and completed in 1929

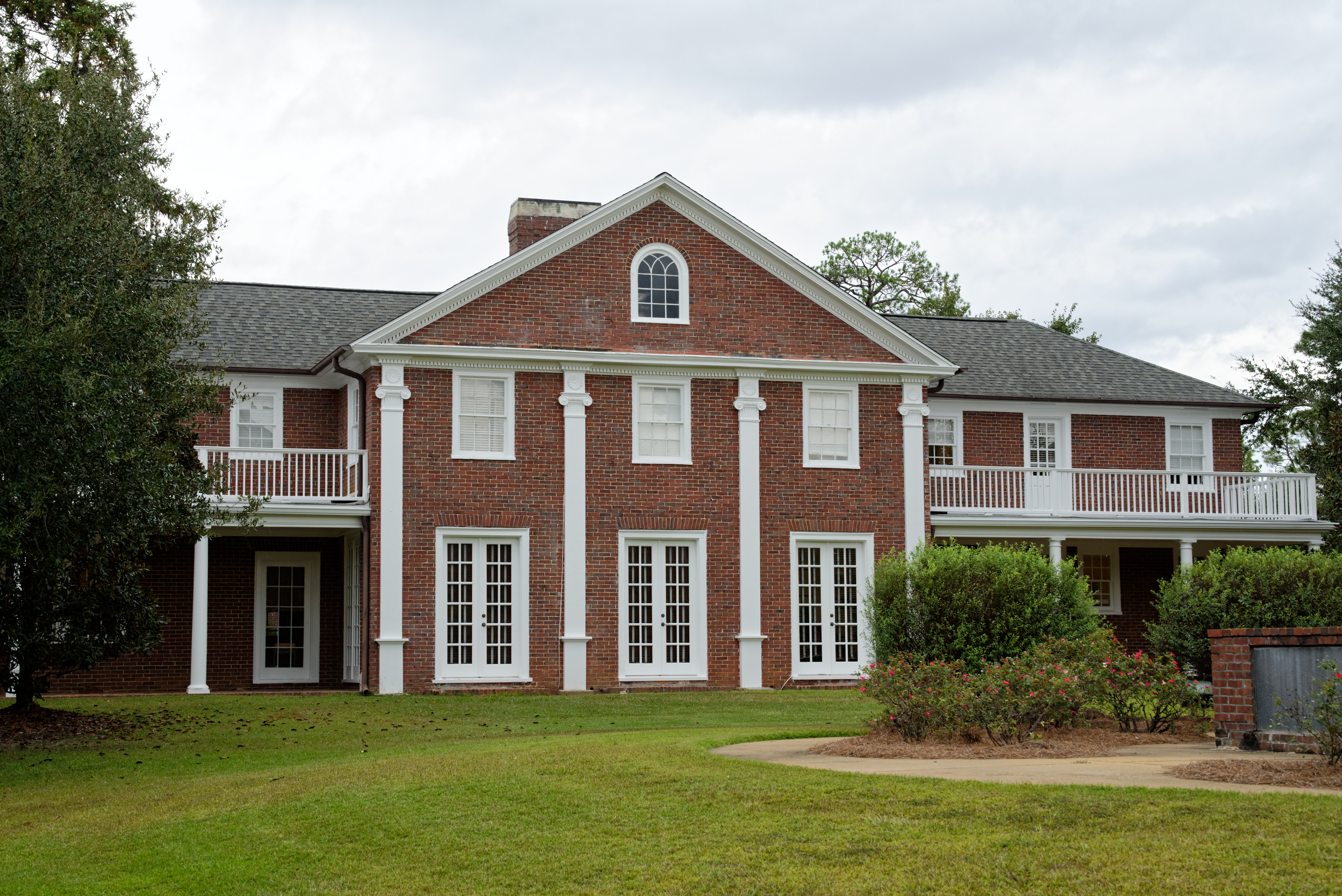
Birdwood near Thomasville, Georgia, designed in the Georgian Revival style and completed in 1932

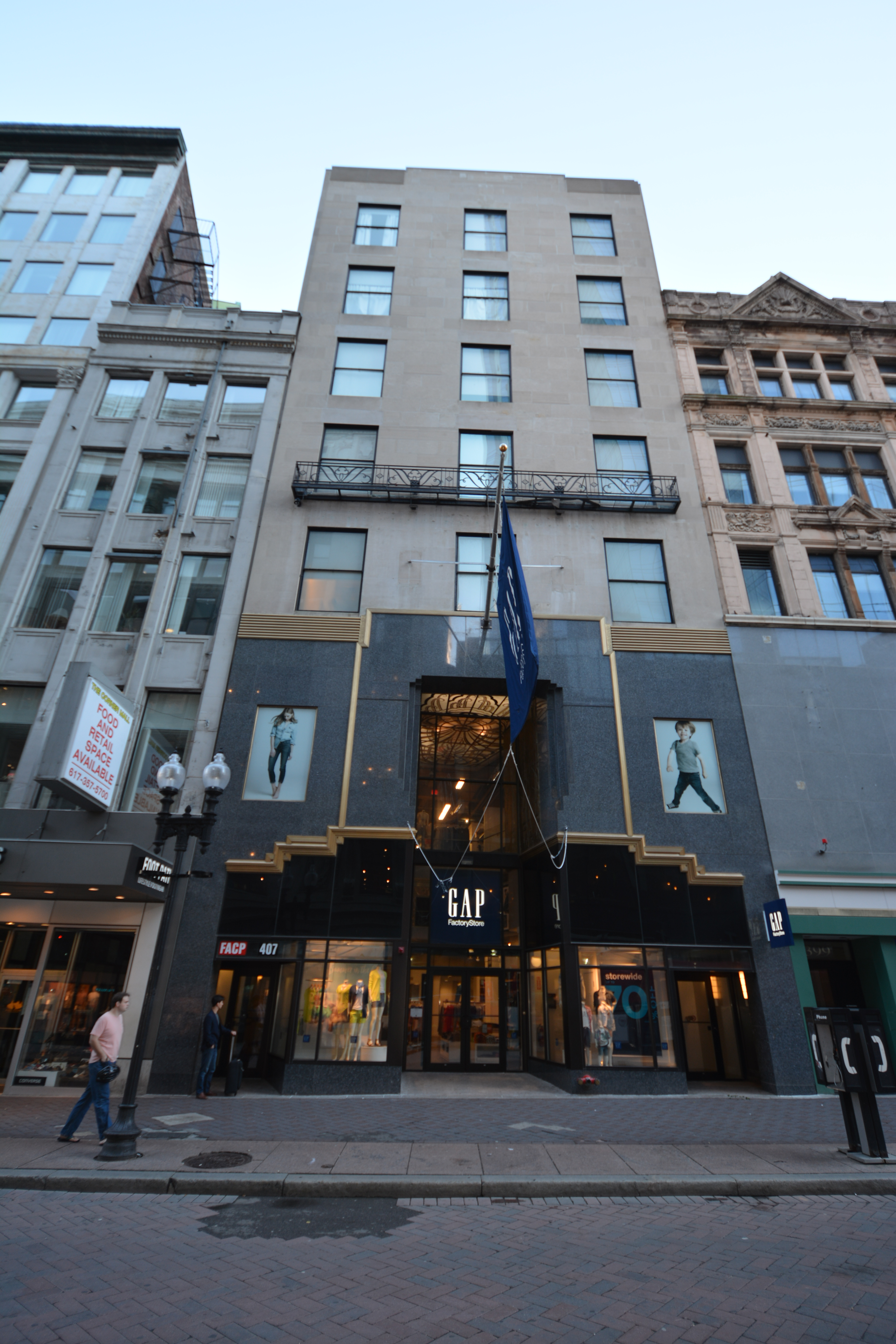
The I.J. Fox Building in Boston, designed in the Art Deco style and completed in 1935

Shepard & Stearns was an architecture partnership that operated in Boston and greater New England. Its principal partners were George F. Shepard (1873–1953) and Frederic B. Stearns (1874–1959). They worked together starting in 1913 although the partnership was not formed until 1921.

== History and work ==
In 1913 architect George F. Shepard established an independent architectural firm in Boston. In 1921 he formed the partnership of Shepard & Stearns with Frederic B. Stearns, who had been an associate of the firm since its founding. In their time most of the early work of the firm, such as the Phi Beta Epsilon fraternity house (1916) in Cambridge, the Louis A. Coolidge house (1918) in Milton and the Walter Baker & Company office building (1919) in Lower Mills, was credited to Shepard alone. An exception was the Suburban Club (1914, NRHP-listed) in Stamford, Connecticut, for which Stearns was principal architect and which was credited to both. They designed the Suburban Club in the Federal variant of the Colonial Revival style then popular for American gentlemen's clubs.

Once the partnership was formed, it lasted nearly thirty years. Their most visible work, almost all of it Colonial or Federal Revival, dates from the 1920s and 1930s. In Boston proper their major works were the YWCA (1929, NRHP-listed) and the I.J. Fox Building (1935, NRHP-listed). The Fox building, designed with retail designers Elias, Rothschild & Company, is a rare example of Art Deco architecture in downtown Boston and in their portfolio.

There is a concentration of their work in Quincy, where they designed the Reay E. Sterling Middle School (1927, NRHP-listed, demolished) and the Quincy Mutual Fire Insurance Company Building (1931) as well as a wide range of projects for wealthy landowner Henry Munroe Faxon, including the Munroe Building (1929, NRHP-listed), a remodeling of his house (1931, NRHP-listed) and an addition to the Quincy Electric Light and Power Company Station (1925, NRHP-listed). Other suburban works include the former Braintree High School (1927) and buildings for Milton Academy and the Fessenden School. One of their last buildings was the Williams Elementary School (1950) in Newton, an attempt at International Style modernism.

The firm worked almost exclusively in New England; outside of it, they are known to have designed two Georgian Revival country houses. The first, Brookthorpe (1922, demolished) was built in Haverford, Pennsylvania, for J. Stanley Reeve and his wife, Katherine Roosevelt, a granddaughter of Augustus Lowell. The second, Birdwood (1932, NRHP-listed), was built near Thomasville, Georgia, for William Cameron Forbes. Forbes, a member of a wealthy Boston family, was a former governor-general of the Philippines and retiring ambassador of the United States to Japan. The main house is now Forbes Hall, the administration building of Thomas University.

The firm was dissolved in 1950 when Stearns retired.

== Partner biographies ==
George Frederick Shepard (May 12, 1873 – March 27, 1953) was born in Charlestown, Massachusetts, now annexed to Boston, and was educated at the Massachusetts Institute of Technology (MIT), graduating with an SB in architecture in 1896. He worked for Boston and New York City architects until joining the Boston firm of Derby & Robinson as a partner, forming Derby, Robinson & Shepard. This firm was responsible for the Parkman Bandstand (1912) on Boston Common. In 1913 Shepard opened an office of his own.

Shepard was married in 1900 to Ora McMicken; they had one child, a daughter. He was a member of the American Institute of Architects (AIA) and the Boston Society of Architects. He died in Milton at the age of 79.

Frederic Baldwin Stearns (December 19, 1874 – April 25, 1959) was born in Brookline, Massachusetts, to George M. Stearns and Mary Stearns, née Baldwin. Boston architect John Goddard Stearns Jr. was his uncle. Like Shepard Stearns was educated at MIT, graduating with the same degree in 1899. He worked for several architects before joining Derby & Robinson in 1908. When Shepard opened his independent office, Stearns went with him.

Stearns was married in 1910 to Eva Wormell Gillard; they had one child, a son. As a young man he was a member of the First Corps of Cadets of Massachusetts and was later a member of the AIA. He died in Pocasset at the age of 83.
