= Greenwich Council =

Greenwich Council may refer to:

- Greenwich Council (Boy Scouts of America)
- Greenwich Metropolitan Borough Council
- Greenwich London Borough Council
