= Alfred Dater =

American business executive (1872–1938)

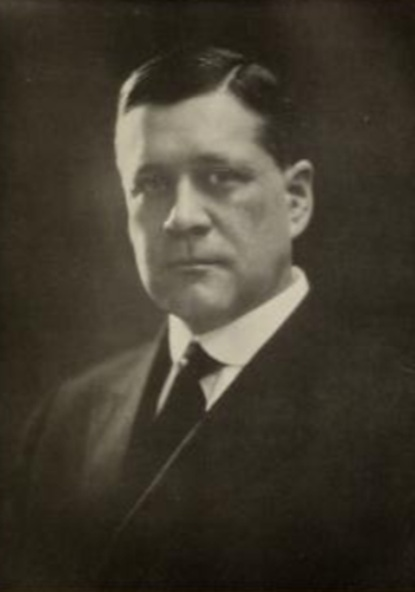
- Born: Alfred Warner Dater; August 23, 1872; Brooklyn, New York, US
- Died: February 21, 1938 (aged 65); Stamford, Connecticut, US
- Education: Yale University, Ph.B. 1895
- Occupation: President
- Employer(s): Stamford Gas and Electric Company
- Awards: Silver Buffalo Award

Signature
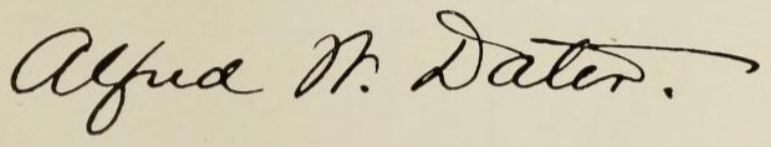

Alfred Warner Dater (August 23, 1872 – February 21, 1938) was an American business executive. He was president of the Stamford Gas and Electric Company and the vice chairman of the Connecticut Power Company. Deter was also active in the early history of the Boy Scouts of America and received their Silver Buffalo Award.

== Early life ==
Dater was born on August 23, 1872, in Brooklyn, New York. He was the son of Ada H. (née McMurray) and J. Henry Dater. He attended Aldelphi Academy, followed by Brooklyn Polytechnic Institute, graduating from the Dwight School of New York City.

He attended Sheffield Scientific School at Yale University, graduating with a Ph.B. in 1895. While there, he was vice president of his class, played on the varsity football team, and rowed two years on varsity crew. He was also a member of the fraternity of Delta Psi (St. Anthony Hall).

== Career ==
After college, Dater apprenticed as a machinist with the Pennsylvania Railroad Company in Fort Wayne, Indiana. In 1897, he became the assistant general superintendent of the Kings County Electric Light and Power Company in Brooklyn, New York. When the power company merged with Edison Electric Illuminating Company, Dater became the treasurer for Edison until 1902.

In 1903, Dater started working for Stamford Gas and Electric Company. Upon the death of its treasurer, Dater took on that position. In 1909, he moved to Williamstown, Massachusetts, to work for the Windsor Print Works of North Adams. After two years, he returned to Stamford, serving as its vice president and general manager. He was elected president of the Stamford Gas and Electric Company in 1917.

Dater served as a director of the First Stamford National Bank and Trust Company, Nazareth Cement Company, the Stamford Water Company, and the Windsor Print Works. He was the vice chairman of the Connecticut Power Company and president of the Stamford Savings Bank.

== Personal life ==
Dater married Grace Carroll Ferguson of Stamford on November 23, 1898. They had three children: Walter Ferguson Dater, Afred W. Dater Jr., and Philip Dater. They lived at 178 Strawberry Hill Avenue in Stamford.

During World War I, Dater was chairman of the local board of the United States Fuel Administration. Dater was president of the Stamford Community Chest, the vice president and treasurer of Stamford Children's Home, and director of the Stamford Chamber of Commerce. He was a member of the Stamford School Board and was an incorporator of the Stamford Hospital.

Dater founded the first scout troop in Stamford in 1912 and was the local council's first president. He served on the national council of the Boy Scouts of America and was president of the local council for 21 years. Dater was also the first chairman of the national BSA Sea Scout Committee.

Dater was president of the Suburban Club and rear commodore of the Stamford Yacht Club. He was a member of the Graduate's Club of New Haven, the St. Anthony Club of New York, the Stamford Rotary Club, the Woodway Country Club in Stamford, and The Yale Club of New York City. He was also a member of the vestry of St. John's Episcopal Church in Stamford.

Dater died at his home in Stamford on February 21, 1938, at the age of 68 years.

== Honors ==
In 1932, Dater received the Silver Buffalo Award, Scouting's highest commendation.

The Stamford Council of the Boy Scouts of America was renamed the Alfred W. Dater Council in his honor in 1938.

== See also ==
- List of recipients of the Silver Buffalo Award
- List of St. Anthony Hall members
