= Munroe Building =

- U.S. National Register of Historic Places
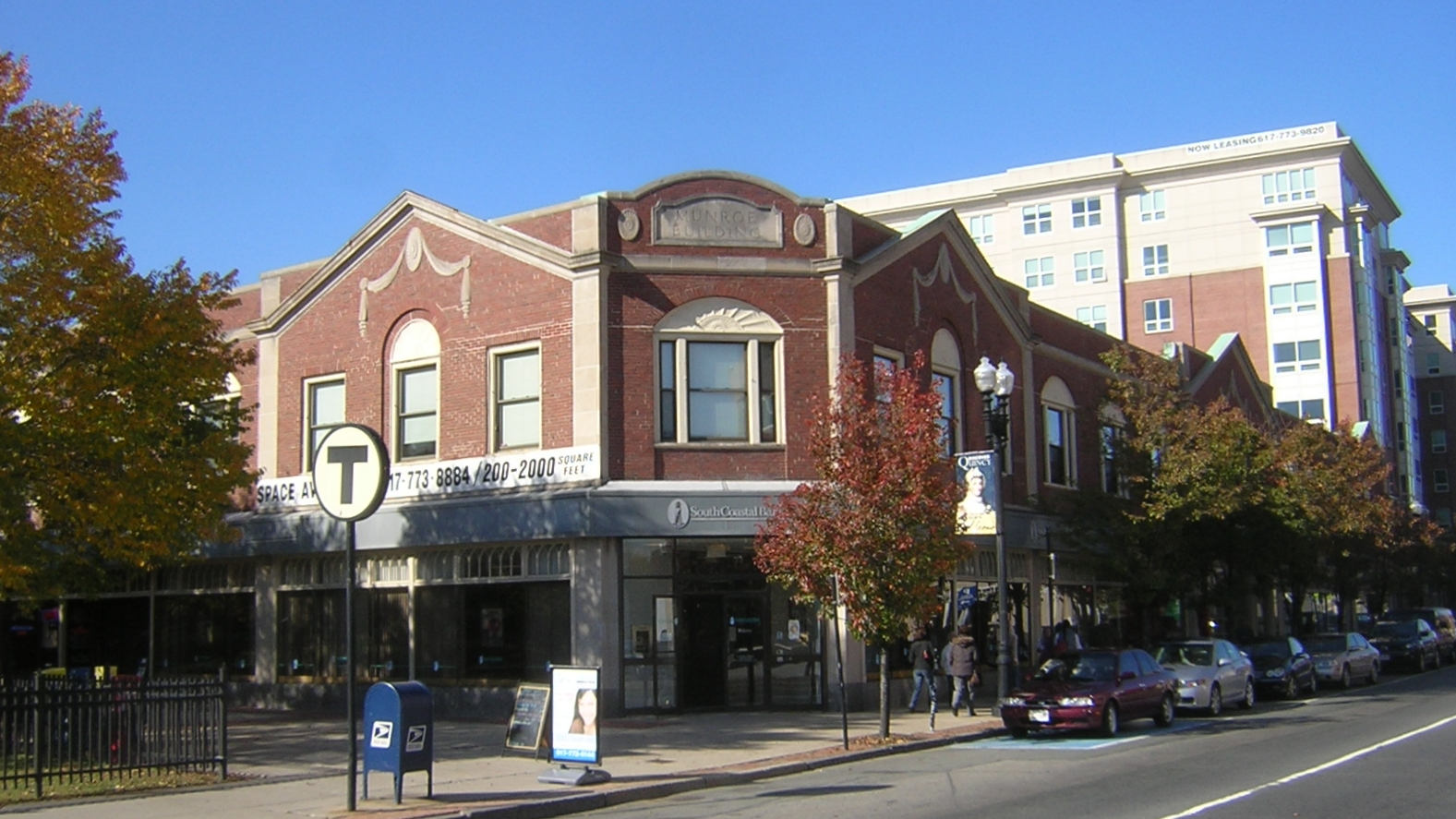

- Location within Massachusetts Location within the United States
- Location: 1227--1259 Hancock St., Quincy, Massachusetts
- Coordinates: 42°15′7″N 71°0′15″W
- Area: 1.2 acres (0.49 ha)
- Built: 1929
- Architect: Shepard & Stearns
- Architectural style: Colonial Revival
- MPS: Quincy MRA
- NRHP reference No.: 89001349
- Added to NRHP: September 20, 1989

The Munroe Building is a historic commercial building at 1227-1259 Hancock Street in Quincy, Massachusetts. Built in 1929 to a design by Shepard & Stearns, it is the best-preserved of two adjacent Colonial Revival two-story commercial blocks built on Hancock Street in the 1920s. The building was listed on the National Register of Historic Places in 1989.

== Description and history ==
The Munroe Building is set on the southwest side of Hancock Street in downtown Quincy, between the street and the Quincy Center MBTA station. To its southeast is a public park, with Quincy City Hall at the far end. It is a rectangular two-story structure, faced in brick with stone trim. The street and park-facing facades are similar, with commercial storefronts on the ground floor that are predominantly 1980s vintage glass and aluminum. The upper level is characterized by a series of gables, each of which has a central window topped by a blind round arch, and flanking sash windows, in a variant of the Palladian window concept. The central window is surrounded by a garland. Between the gable sections are smaller sections with single sash windows that have blind segmented-arch tops.

The Colonial Revival building was designed by Shepard & Stearns and built in 1929. Then, as now, it housed retail stores on the ground floor and professional offices above. It was built by Henry Munroe Faxon, a major real estate owner of the period. The Dimmock Building, a block down Hancock Street, is another Colonial Revival building from 1929; it has been substantially altered.

== See also ==
- National Register of Historic Places listings in Quincy, Massachusetts
