= Suburban Club =

- U.S. National Register of Historic Places
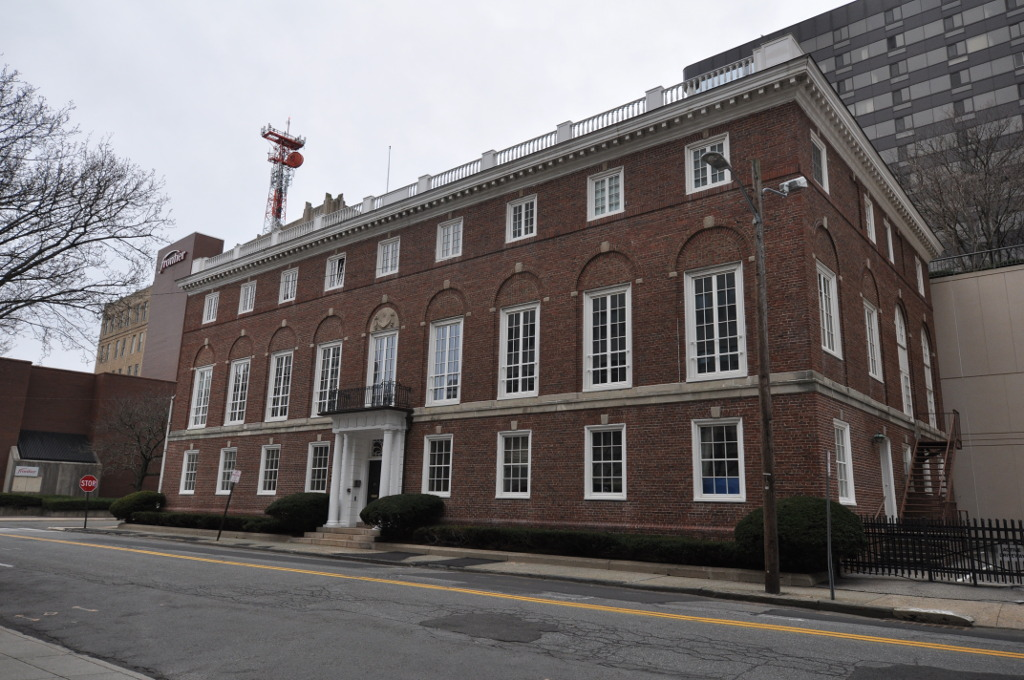

- Location within Connecticut Location within the United States
- Location: 6 Suburban Avenue/580 Main Street, Stamford, Connecticut
- Coordinates: 41°3′16″N 73°32′8″W
- Area: less than one acre
- Built: 1914
- Architect: Stearns, Frederick B.; Shepard, George F.
- Architectural style: Late 19th and 20th Century Revivals, Neo-Federal
- NRHP reference No.: 89001090
- Added to NRHP: August 10, 1989

The Suburban Club is a historic clubhouse at 6 Suburban Avenue/580 Main Street in Stamford, Connecticut. Built in 1914, the building was one of the first commissions by architects George F. Shepard and Frederick B. Stearns. The club used the building until it ceased operations in 1935. The building was listed on the National Register of Historic Places in 1989.

== History ==
The Suburban Club was conceived in 1890 by ten men in their mid-twenties in Stamford, Connecticut. When coming home from a party, the men stopped at the steps of the Stamford Savings Bank, where they drank champagne and discussed creating a social club. An organizational meeting was held on September 19, 1890, at the Stamford Savings Bank.

Frederick C. Taylor, an attorney and later probate judge, presided over the meeting and was elected club president. The other charter members were Wilson L. Baldwin, Frank W. Bogardus, William T. Brown, Alexander Crammond, Walter D. Daskum, Harry F. Devens, Sherman Dewey, J. D. Goulden, C. W. Hendrie, William H. Holly, William H. Martin, and Everett Noyes.

The purpose of the Suburban Club was "social intercourse". Originally, the club met in rooms in the National Bank Building. On January 28, 1891, a committee was created to find rooms for the club. On March 25, 1891, the club rented an entire floor in the Florance Building, a commercial building in on Atlantic Street downtown Stamford. Their suite in the Florence consisted of eight rooms, including a billards room, a cloak room, a game room, a music room, a parlor, a reading room, rental rooms, and bathrooms. By April 1891, the club had acquired an upright piano and a billiards table.

In 1894, the club moved into Greyrock Manor, one of the largest houses in Stamford, on the corner of Main Street. The club had secured a five-year lease, with an option to purchase the property. This property included nine or ten rooms that were available to rent, appealing to the club's members who were bachelors.

The club's founders became leading citations of Stamford. Thus, the Suburban Club became a major social center for the elite men of Stamford. In November 1893, it had fifty members. Ten years later, in November 1893 By 1914, the club had expanded to 240 members.

Built in 1914, the clubhouse building was one of the first commissions by Boston architects George F. Shepard and Frederick B. Stearns of Shepard and Sterns, who worked together until 1950 on many projects. The clubhouse was located at 6 Suburban Avenue/580 Main Street in downtown Stamford. The Stamford Advocate wrote that it was a "clubhouse which is going to make the City of Stamford cling in the memory of every non-member who visits it." Its facilities included several billiard rooms, bowling in the basement, two dining rooms (one for men and one for women guests), and a men's grill. In addition, club members could rent accommodations on the third floor.

In the 1930s, social conditions in Stamford had changed, with competition from a country club and the financial constraints of the Great Depression. On October 30, 1935, the club held a farewell party. The Suburban Club closed in 1935.

In 1941, the building was leased by the White Tower Management Corporation, operator of the White Tower Hamburgers chain. The building was listed on the National Register of Historic Places on August 10, 1989. The former clubhouse is now an office building.

== Architecture ==
The Suburban Club is a three-story brick structure, topped by a flat roof that has a parapet and balustrade ringing it on three sides. The main entrance features a flat-roofed portico of the Roman Doric order with Tuscan columns, with a wrought iron balustrade above the portico. Its interior features elegant woodwork, including a lobby with a beamed ceiling and wainscot.

It is architecturally significant as a Neo-Federal work in Stamford, and historically significant as one of the few buildings of the period to survive in downtown Stamford.

== Notable members ==
Notable members of the Suburban Club include George Pratt Ingersoll, a lawyer and United States Ambassador to Siam, and Alfred Dater, president of the Stamford Gas and Electric Company and the vice chairman of the Connecticut Power Company. Dater was also a president of the Suburban Club.

== See also ==
- History of Stamford, Connecticut
- National Register of Historic Places listings in Stamford, Connecticut
