= Faxon House =

Historic house in Massachusetts, United States

- U.S. National Register of Historic Places
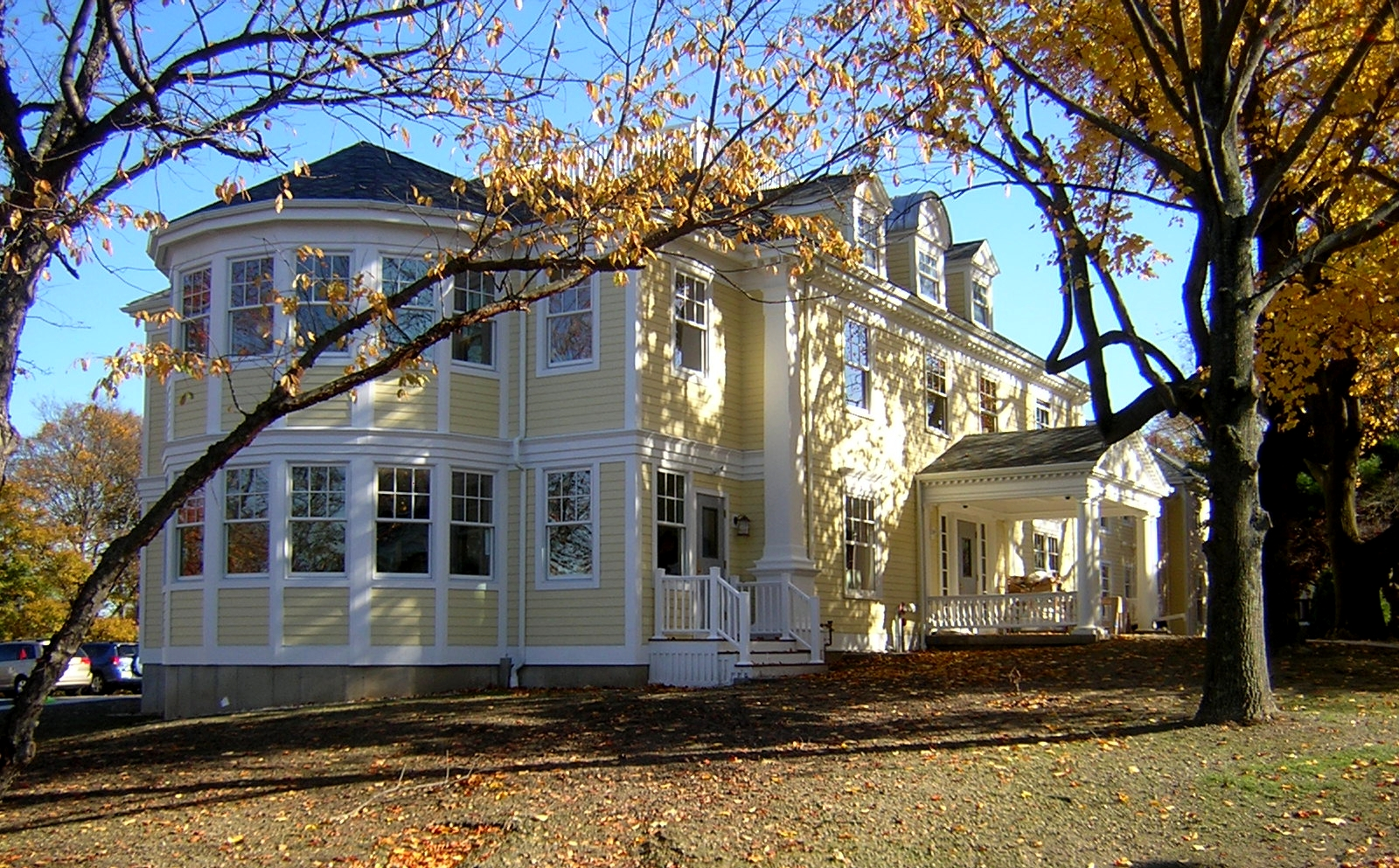

- Location within Massachusetts Location within the United States
- Location: 310 Adams St., Quincy, Massachusetts
- Coordinates: 42°15′9.4″N 71°0′58.9″W
- Area: less than one acre
- Built: 1880
- Architect: Shepard & Stearns (1931)
- Architectural style: Colonial Revival
- MPS: Quincy MRA
- NRHP reference No.: 89001310
- Added to NRHP: September 20, 1989

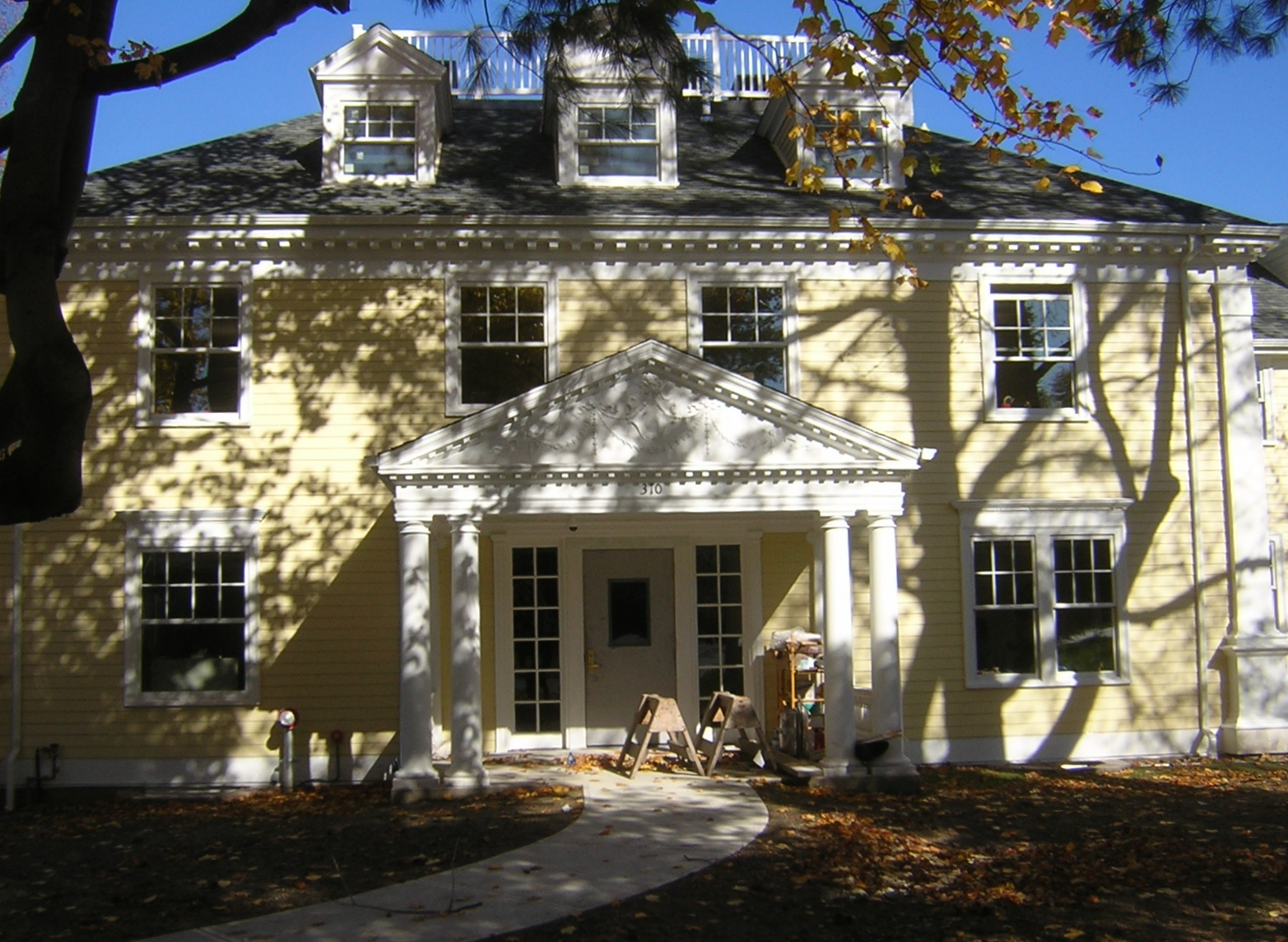

The Faxon House is a historic house at 310 Adams Street in Quincy, Massachusetts. The oldest portion of this house was built in 1880 by Job Faxon, a Boston-based flour merchant. His son Henry retained the Boston firm of Shepard & Stearns, and expanded and redesigned the house in the Colonial Revival style in 1931, a time when larger estates on Adams Street were being subdivided for development. The house is one of the most elaborate and well-preserved examples of the style in Quincy.

The house was listed on the National Register of Historic Places in 1989.

== See also ==
- National Register of Historic Places listings in Quincy, Massachusetts
