= I.J. Fox Building =

- U.S. National Register of Historic Places
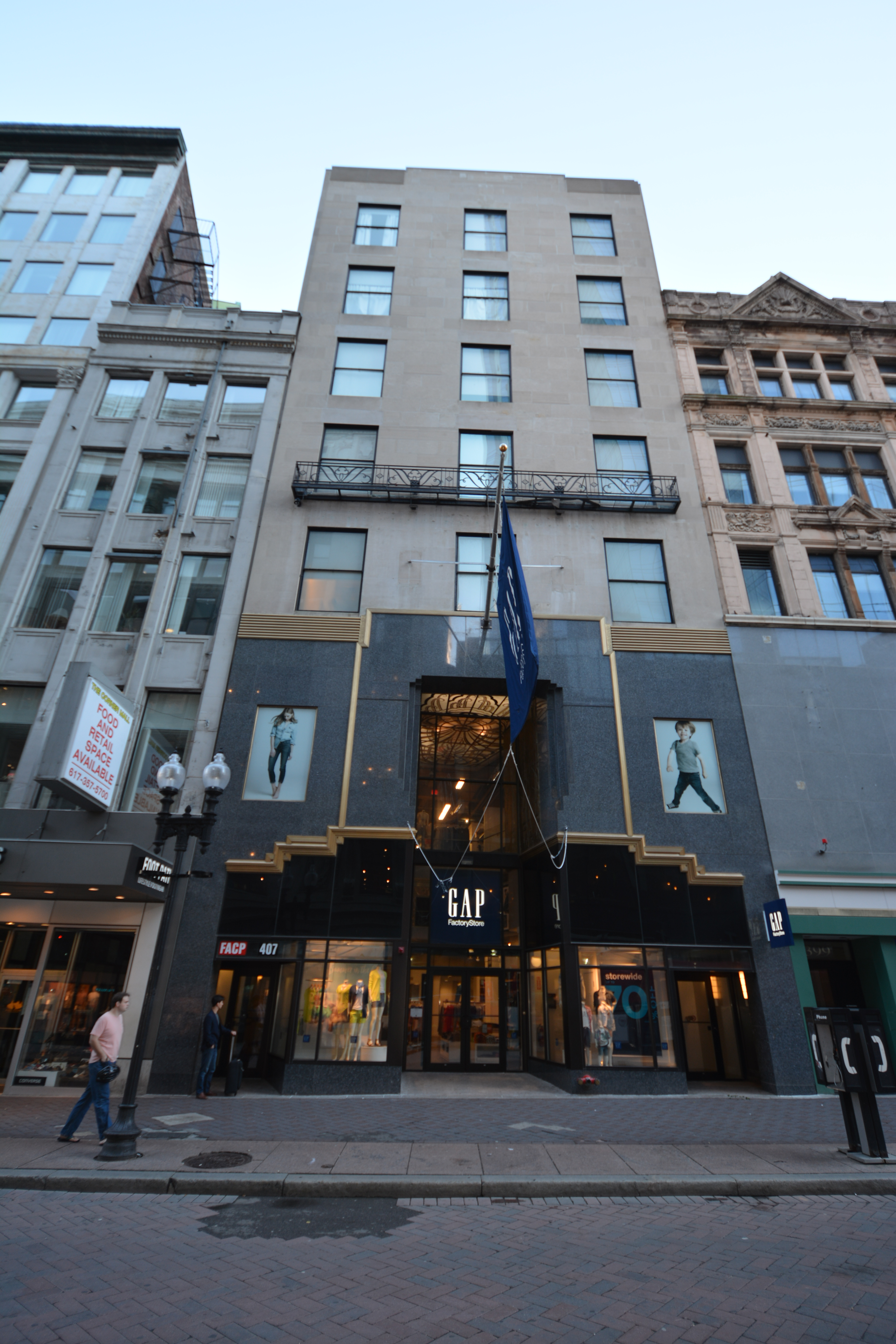

- Location within Boston Location within Massachusetts Location within the United States
- Location: 407 Washington St., Boston, Massachusetts
- Coordinates: 42°21′21″N 71°3′36″W
- Area: less than one acre
- Built: 1934
- Architects: Shepard & Stearns; Elias, Rothchild & Company
- Architectural style: Art Deco
- NRHP reference No.: 15000942
- Added to NRHP: December 29, 2015

The I.J. Fox Building is a historic commercial building located at 407 Washington Street in Downtown Boston, Massachusetts.

== Description and history ==
It is a seven-story masonry structure, three bays wide, with Moderne and Art Deco styling. It was built in 1934 as the premiere city showroom and facilities of I.J. Fox, then one of the nation's leading furriers. It is one of the city's finest examples of the Moderne style, with its most prominent feature a polished granite two-story entrance.

The first, second, and basement floors have been occupied by a Gap Factory Store since 2014. It was previously occupied by a FYE Store, and before that a Strawberry Records store.

The building was listed on the National Register of Historic Places on December 29, 2015.

== See also ==
- National Register of Historic Places listings in northern Boston, Massachusetts
