= George Pratt Ingersoll =

American politician and diplomat

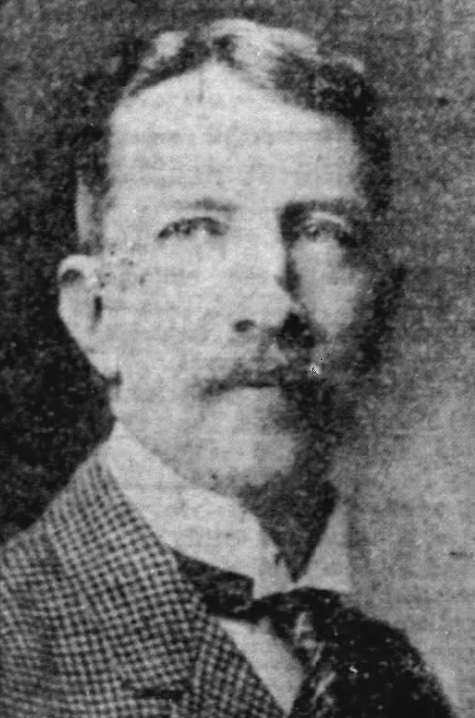

Envoy Extraordinary and Minister Plenipotentiary to Siam
- In office August 8, 1917 – June 23, 1918

Personal details
- Born: April 24, 1861 New Haven, Connecticut, US
- Died: February 24, 1927 (aged 65) Stamford, Connecticut, US
- Education: Trinity College, B.A.1883, M.A. 1885; Yale Law School, LL.B. 1885
- Profession: Attorney

George Pratt Ingersoll (April 24, 1861 – February 24, 1927) was an American diplomat, politician, and lawyer. He was the U.S. Minister to Siam. He was also the vice chairman of the National Democratic Committee.

== Early life ==
Ingersoll was born on April 24, 1861, in New Haven, Connecticut. He was the son of Julia Harriet (née Pratt) and Colin M. Ingersoll, a member of the United States House of Representatives, Connecticut Adjutant General, and acting U.S. Ambassidor to Russia.

Ingersoll came from a noted political family. His grandfathers were Ralph Isaacs Ingersoll and Zadock Pratt, both members of the United States House of Representatives. His great-grandfather was Jonathan Ingersoll, a member of the United States House of Representatives and the Lieutenant Governor of Connecticut. His uncles were Charles Roberts Ingersoll, a three-term Governor of Connecticut, and George Watson Pratt, a member of the New York State Senate.

Ingersoll attended the Hopkins Grammar School in New Haven and studied in Geneva, Switzerland. He attended Trinity College, graduating with a B.A. in 1883. While at Trinity, he was a member of the fraternity Delta Psi. In addition, the college's faculty selected him to speak at commencement. In 1885, Ingersoll graduated from Yale Law School with an LL.B degree and from Trinity College with a M.A. degree. He was admitted to the Connecticut and New York state bars in 1885.

== Career ==
Ingersoll practiced law in both Connecticut and New York. He was a member of Murray, Ingersoll, Hodge & Humphrey of 22 William Street in New York City. He was then a partner in the practice of Tyler, Ingersoll & Morgan in New Haven. In October 1914, he became an associate counsel, later a consulting counsel, with the Stamford firm Cummings & Lockwood. His legal speciality was trust estates.

In 1889, the United States circuit court appointed Ingersoll as United States Commissioner for Connecticut. Governor Luzon B. Morris appointed Ingersoll as the legal representative for the Connecuticut Board of Health in 1893. He also oversaw legal work for Morris while he was governor. In 1903, Ingersoll was the Democratic nominee for the judge of probate in Ridgefield, Connecticut, serving in that capacity for several years.

Ingersoll became active in local politics and was a delegate to the 1900 democratic national convention. In 1910, Governor Frank B. Weeks appointed him as Connecticut's representative to the International Peace Conference in Washington, D.C. Ingersoll was an unsuccessful candidate for U.S. House of Representatives as a Democrat from Connecticut in 1910. Later, he declined to run for the United States Senate.

In 1914, Ingersoll was vice chair of the national Democratic party and was appointed as the proscecuting attorney for Fairfield County, Connecticut. He was also the vice president of the First National Bank of Ridgefield. Ingersoll retired from practicing law in 1917.

In August 1917, President Woodrow Wilson selected Ingersoll to be the ambassidor to Siam, now Thailand. Ingergall was the Envoy Extraordinary and Minister Plenipotentiary to Siam, from August 8, 1917, to June 23, 1918.

== Personal life ==
On November 3, 1891, Ingersoll married Alice Witherspoon at Trinity Church in New Haven. She was the daughter of Rev. Orlando Witherspoon of Buffalo, New York and a descendant of founding father John Witherspoon. The couple had two children: Collin M. Ingersoll and Gertrude M. Ingeroll. They lived at 67 Glenbrook Road in Stamford, Connecticut and had a summer home in Ridgefield, Connecticut called Ingleside.

Ingersoll was a trustee to the Berkeley Divinity School at Yale and the Connecticut School for Boys. He belonged to the Metropolitan Club of New York City and the Suburban Club of Stamford. He was president of the Stamford Historical Society. Ingersoll was an Epsicopalian.

Ingersoll died in Stamford Hospital in Stamford on February 24, 1927, after being sick for two months. He was buried in the Fairlawn Cemetery in Ridgefield, Connecticut. Ingeroll was one of the four incorporators of the cemetery on October 30, 1908.
