= Quincy Electric Light and Power Company Station =

- U.S. National Register of Historic Places
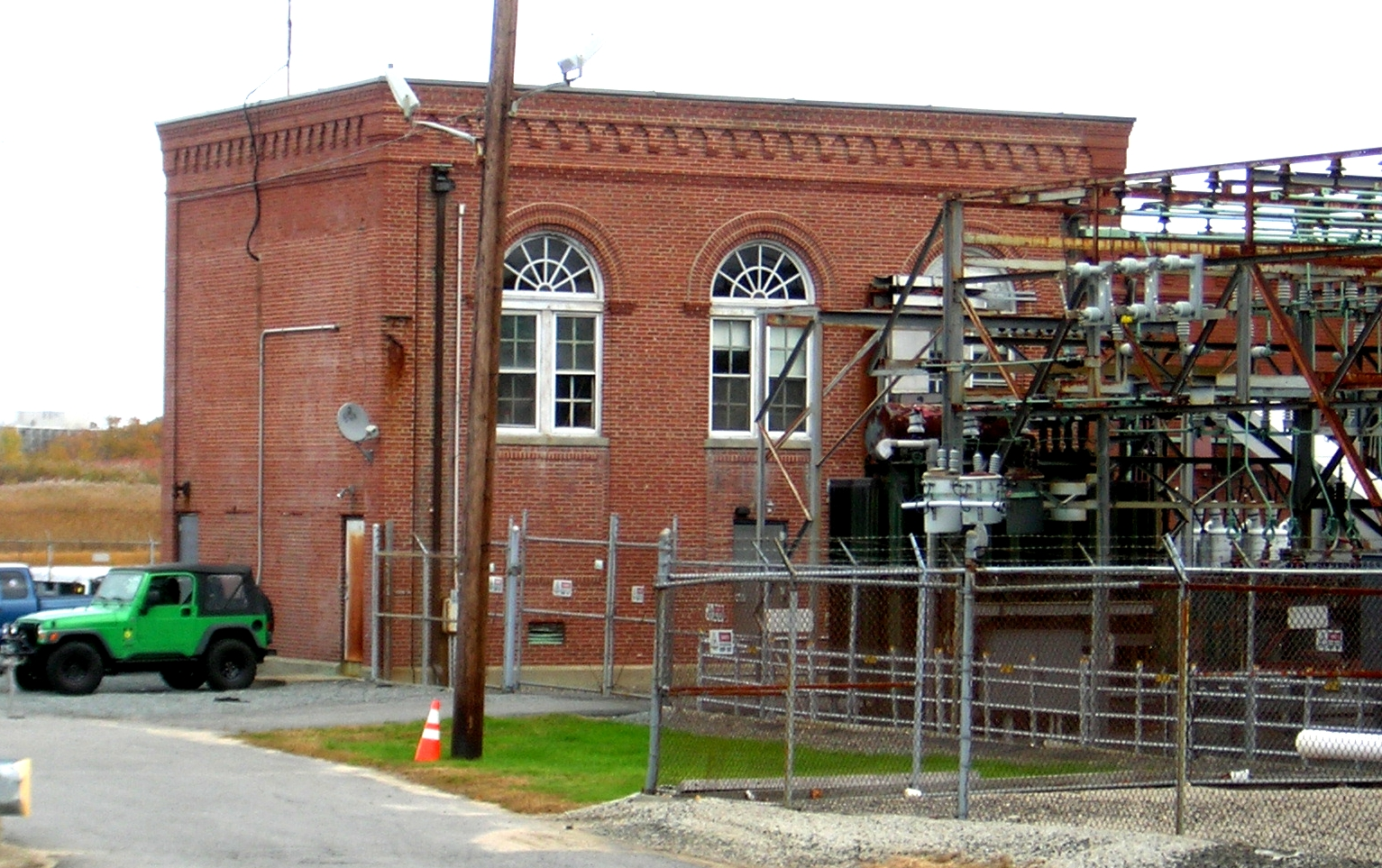

- Location within Massachusetts Location within the United States
- Location: 76 Field St., Quincy, Massachusetts
- Coordinates: 42°15′16.4″N 70°59′31″W
- Area: 1.6 acres (0.65 ha)
- Built: 1902
- Architect: Shepard & Stearns (1925)
- Architectural style: Colonial Revival
- MPS: Quincy MRA
- NRHP reference No.: 89001332
- Added to NRHP: September 20, 1989

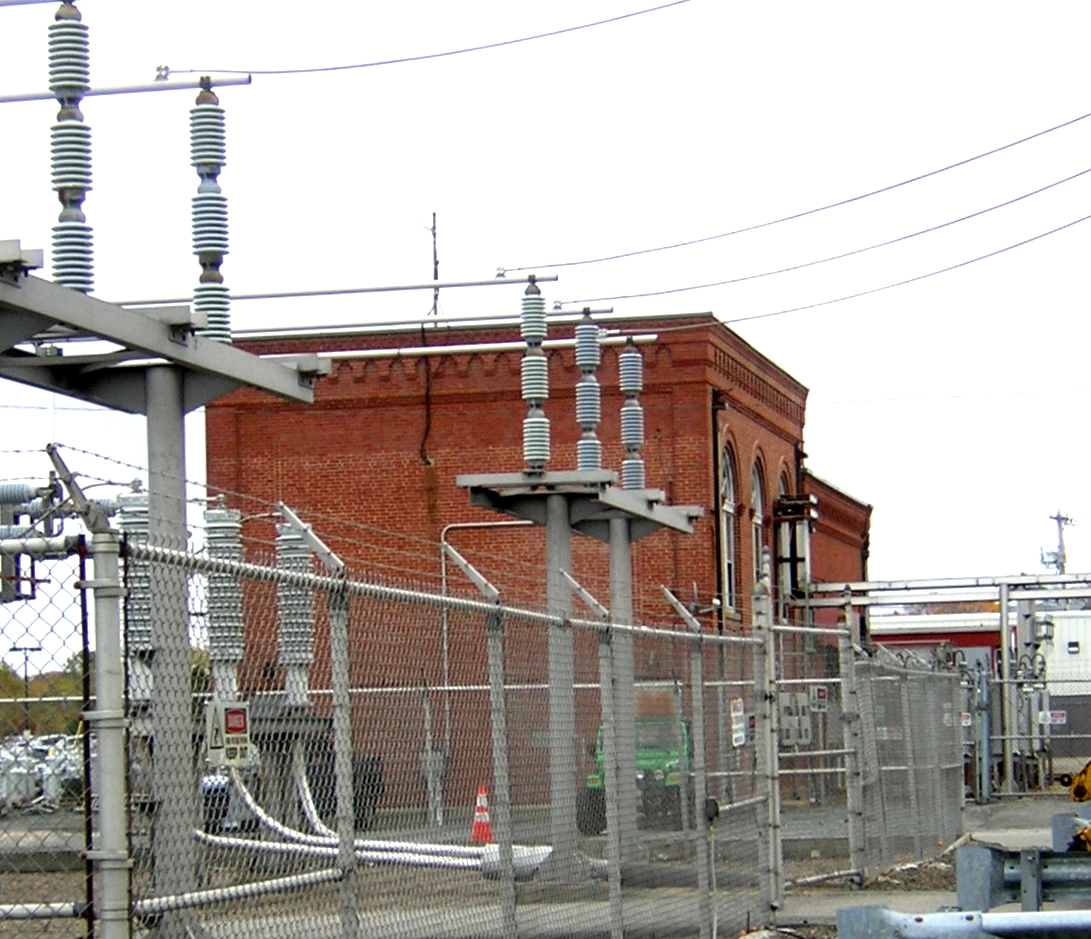

The Quincy Electric Light and Power Company Station is a historic power station at 76 Field Street in Quincy, Massachusetts. Built in 1902, it is a well-preserved example of industrial Colonial Revival architecture executed in brick. It housed a coal-fired plant until 1920, and now serves as a local power substation. The building was listed on the National Register of Historic Places in 1989.

== Description and history ==
The power station is located on the north side of Field Street, an industrial area between Massachusetts Route 3A and the Town River, a tidal inlet of the Weymouth Fore River on Quincy's coast. It is a large brick structure, with three interior levels of work space. Its southern facade has three round-arch windows, set above recessed brick panels. The flat roof stands above a modillioned cornice, which is supported by brick pilasters at the building corners. A two-story addition extends to the east, exhibiting similar stylistic details.

The Quincy Electric Light and Power Company was founded in 1888 by local businessmen to provide electricity to the community. By 1901, its customer base had grown to be the largest of all the electric companies in Norfolk County. It had this building constructed in 1902 to house a coal-fired power station, sited on the water to ease the delivery of coal. It operated the plant until November 1920, when it switched to purchasing electricity from Boston Edison instead. It continues to be used as a power distribution substation.

== See also ==
- National Register of Historic Places listings in Quincy, Massachusetts
