= Birdwood (Thomasville, Georgia) =

Historic house in Georgia, United States

- U.S. National Register of Historic Places
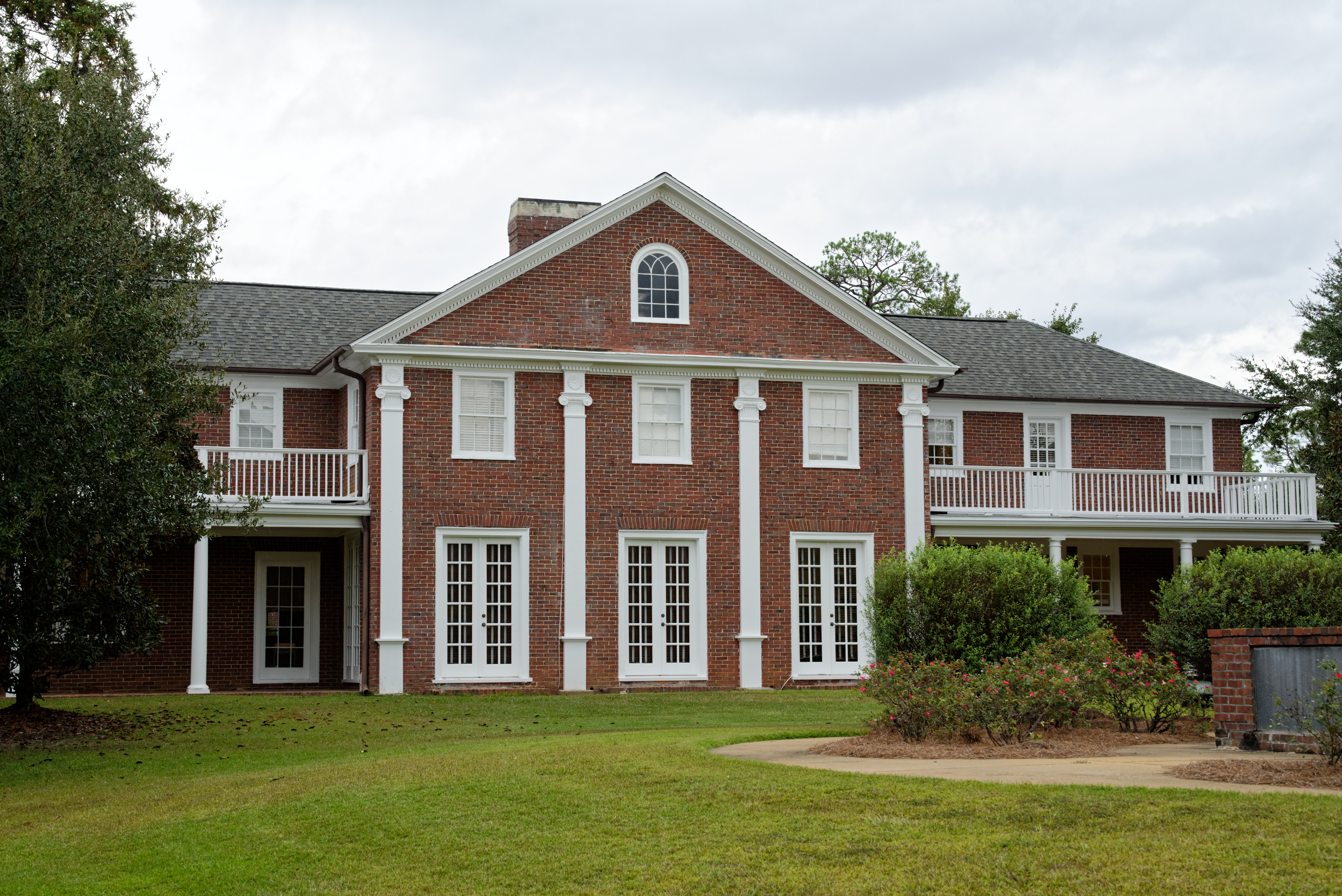
- Birdwood, 2019

- Location within Georgia Location within the United States
- Location: Millpond Rd. and Pinetree Blvd., Thomasville, Georgia
- Coordinates: 30.815°N 83.964444°W
- Area: 17.2 acres (7.0 ha)
- Built: 1932
- Architect: Shepard & Stearns
- Architectural style: Colonial Revival, Georgian Revival
- NRHP reference No.: 86000917
- Added to NRHP: May 2, 1986

Birdwood is a 17.2 acres (7.0 ha) estate in Thomasville, Georgia. Its main building is a two-story mansion built in 1931–1932 in then-popular Georgian Revival style at the center of what was a 48-acre property.

The mansion is basically U-shaped in plan, with a two-story colonnade connecting across the ends.

It was built for William Cameron Forbes (1870-1959) of Boston, Massachusetts, "as a seasonal residence and a place to practice and play polo in the winter." Forbes was a grandson of Ralph Waldo Emerson and served as a diplomat for the United States, including serving on the Philippine Commission and as governor general in the Philippines for presidents T.R. Roosevelt and Taft.

It was listed on the National Register of Historic Places in 1986. It is now part of Thomas University, now named Forbes Hall.
