= Scouting in Connecticut =

Scouting in Connecticut has experienced many organizational changes since 1910. With only eight counties, Connecticut has had 40 Boy Scout Councils since the Scouting movement began in 1910. In 1922, 17 Boy Scout Councils existed in Connecticut, but currently only four exist. The Girl Scouts of the USA has had at least 53 Girl Scout Councils in Connecticut since their program began in 1912. Today there is one, Girl Scouts of Connecticut, which assumed operation on October 1, 2007.

== Scouting America ==
=== Current councils ===
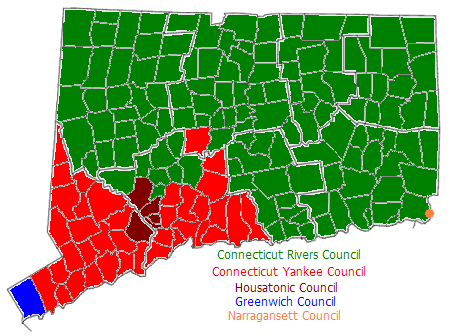
Current Boy Scouts of America Councils in Connecticut

Connecticut has had as many as forty Scouting America councils since 1910. Currently five councils exist in Connecticut. Four Councils (Connecticut Rivers, Connecticut Yankee, Greenwich and Housatonic) are located within the state of Connecticut. The fifth, Narragansett Council in Rhode Island, serves the youth in the community of Pawcatuck, Connecticut.

All in all, these Councils serve more than 61,700 boys, young men and women in all facets of the Scouting program. They are led by a volunteer group numbering well over 15,000 men and women. 627 young men were awarded their Eagle Badge in 2005.

In 2005, Scouts gave the citizens of Connecticut well over 750,000 community service hours, ranging from Eagle Scout projects and Scouting for Food to participating in the National Good Turn for America initiative.

The four Connecticut councils operate over 4,000 acres (1,619 ha) of camp grounds which serve over 8,700 boys and girls in Scouting, as well as several more thousands of non-Scouts that use Scout camps throughout the year.

==== Connecticut Rivers Council ====
Connecticut Rivers Council is the largest of the four Connecticut-based Councils. It serves the youth in 127 communities, covering six and a half of the eight counties in Connecticut and Fishers Island, New York.

==== Connecticut Yankee Council ====
Connecticut Yankee Council serves 37 communities which covers half of New Haven county and most of Fairfield counties.

==== Greenwich Council ====
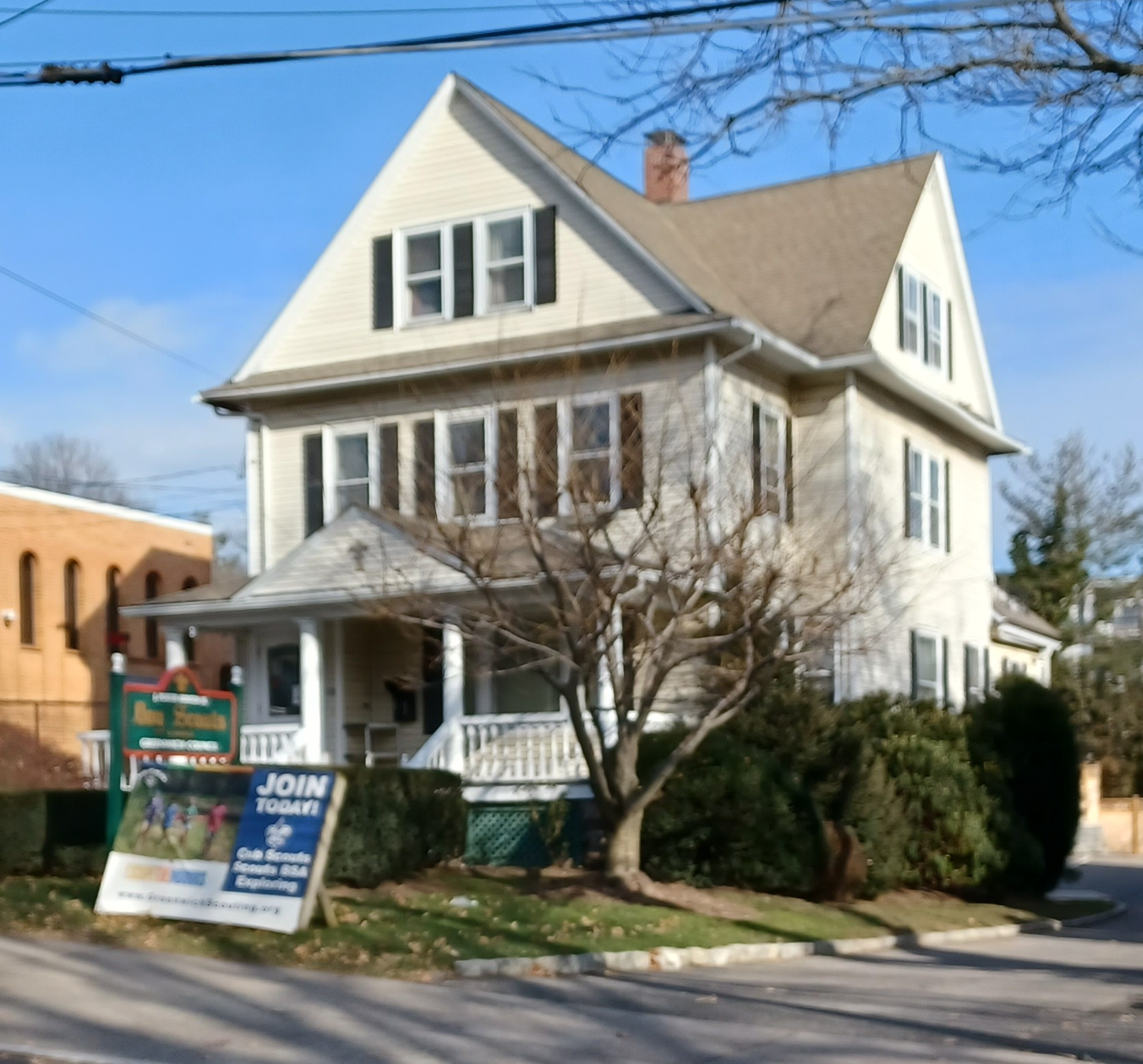
Greenwich Council

Greenwich Council serves one Connecticut community, the town of Greenwich.

==== Housatonic Council ====
Housatonic Council serves 5 communities in the Naugatuck Valley region.

==== Narragansett Council ====
The Narragansett Council's insignia and shoulder patch list "RI MA CT" as the states in which it operates. The council serves all of Rhode Island and several entire counties in Massachusetts. However, the "CT" portion is limited to the village of Pawcatuck, along the Pawcatuck River that separates Connecticut from Rhode Island. Pawcatuck is in the town of Stonington, whose other units are part of the Connecticut Rivers Council.

=== Defunct councils ===
==== Alfred W. Dater Council ====
The Alfred W. Dater Council #078, headquartered in Stamford, Connecticut, came about from a name change of Stamford Council in 1938. Alfred W. Dater had served as the first president of the Stamford Council until his death in February 1938. On December 2, 1938, in honor of his 22 years of service to Stamford Council, the council was renamed in his honor.

The council grew through the 1940s and in 1947 John Sherman Hoyt donated 18 acres (73,000 m^{2}) of land in Norwalk, Connecticut for use for short-term camping. After that the camp was named Five Mile River Camp.

As Scouting celebrated its 40th anniversary in February 1950, the Council joined in by paying its last mortgage payment on Camp Toquam. The Council reported that it was serving 3,269 boys and adults and plans to build their own Scout headquarters in Glenbrook section of Stamford, Connecticut. The building was sponsored by the Union Memorial Church and financed by donations from the Lions Club and by selling a portion of the Five Mile River Camp.

The purchase of the Williams Training Center in the late 1950s was made possible by selling the remaining portion of Five Mile River Camp. The Ponus Lodge #521 of the Order of the Arrow was established in 1956.

The Council celebrated its 50th anniversary in 1967 with 2,620 registered Scouts. In 1971, the Council reported 3,000 registered Scouts. The following year, the Boy Scout Councils of Alfred W. Dater, Mauwehu and Pomperaug voted to consolidate their operations into a new Council. In 1972 the Council ceased operations and the new one, Fairfield County Council, began its history.

===== Ponus Lodge =====
Ponus Lodge #521 was the OA lodge for the Alfred W. Dater Council. Their name comes from the chief of the Rippowam Tribe. Their lodge totem is a "false face" Iroquois mask in the image of "Hoba Mako" (rough spelling). Founded in 1956, the lodge ceased its operations when it merged with Chief Pomperaug #408 and Mauwehu #389 to form Tankiteke Lodge #313 in 1972.

==== Bridgeport Council ====
Bridgeport Council #065 was headquartered in Bridgeport, Connecticut. Founded in 1915, it changed its name to Pomperaug Council in 1936.

==== Bristol Area Council ====
Bristol Area Council #066 was headquartered in Bristol, Connecticut. It was founded in 1918 and operated until it merged with Keemosabee Council to form Nathan Hale Council in 1967.

===== Woapalane Lodge =====
Woapalane Lodge #471 was the OA lodge for Bristol Council. Their name translates to "bald eagle" which is also their lodge totem. The lodge was founded in 1952 and ceased operations in 1967 when it merged with Keemosahbee #234 to form Wihungen #234.

===== Camp Cochipianee =====
The camp was founded in 1928 by the Bristol Area Council. It was sold after the New Britain Area Council and the Bristol Area Councils were merged into what was then called Nathan Hale Council in 1972. The new Council changed the name of New Britain's Camp Keemosabee into Camp Nahaco.

In 1980, a program pavilion at Camp Nahaco was enclosed and insulated. This winter shelter was dedicated in the name of Camp Cochipianee. It shares the parade field with another winter shelter named after the former Camp Keemosabee.

==== Central Connecticut Council ====
Central Connecticut Council #071 had its headquarters in Meriden, Connecticut. The Council came about from a name change of Meriden Council in 1929. The Council encompassed the towns of Meriden, Wallingford, and Southington. It ceased to operate in 1978, when it was absorbed by Quinnipiac Council. It owned Camp Terramuggus. The council also owned Deer Lake Scout Reservation, later operated by the Quinnipiac Council and then the Connecticut Yankee Council until it was sold in 2022 to another organization which will continue to use it as a camp property.

===== Wangunks Lodge =====
Wangunks Lodge #274 was the OA lodge for the Central Connecticut Council. Their name translates to "bend in the river" in the Algonquian language. Their lodge totem is an American eagle. The lodge was absorbed into Arcoon Lodge #369 in 1978.

==== Central Fairfield Council ====
Central Fairfield Council #075 was headquartered in Norwalk, Connecticut. The Council came about from a name change of Norwalk Council in 1933.

==== Charter Oak Council ====
Charter Oak Council #070, was headquartered in Hartford, Connecticut. The Council came about from a name change of Hartford Council in 1933. In 1972, the Council ceased to exist when it merged with Mattatuck, Middlesex County, Nathan Hale and Tunxis to form Long Rivers Council.

Wipunquoak Lodge #558 was the OA lodge for the Charter Oak Council. Their name translates to "white oak" (Lenape). Their lodge totem is the Charter Oak. The lodge was founded in 1964 and ceased operation when it merged with Kiethan #59, Mattatuck #217, Wihungen #234 and Tunxis #491 to form Eluwak #59 in 1973.

===== Lake of Isles Scout Reservation =====
The Lake of Isles Scout Reservation (LOISR) was developed by the Charter Oak Council and had its first summer camp season in 1960, the Jubilee Year of the Boy Scouts of America. The plan was to develop four camps on the more than 1,100 acres (445 ha) that surrounded Lake of Isles, located in North Stonington, Ledyard and Preston townships of rural southeastern Connecticut. For 1960, Camps Pequot and Apache had been the only ones built. A third camp, Camp Cherokee, opened in 1970. This camp was designated an "Explorer Base" (although the Boy Scouting program was the only program that really used the camp as the Exploring program underwent drastic changes by the early 1970s) and featured patrol cooking with a central commissary. The fourth camp never got beyond the planning stage.

The Charter Oak Council merged with four other Councils in 1972 to form Long Rivers Council. By the mid-1970s, with a declining Boy Scout-age demographic nationally and declining Boy Scout membership in general due to the expanding list of organizations for adolescent boys, Long Rivers Council was faced with shutting down a number of their camps to the summer camping experience. For instance, Camp Nahaco closed to regular summer camping after 1977 (although it would occasionally re-open for long-term camping with specialty themes such as "Enviro-Camp"). Camp Tadma was closed in 1977, but a couple of years later opened again as a long-term Webelos Camp.

The plan for LOISR was to close Camp Pequot for two years and run Camp Apache for two years, then switch the status of the camps for the following two years. They expected this to reduce the impact of a summer camp season on the land by spreading out the wear and tear. So in 1975 and 1976, Camp Pequot was placed in "conservation status", and Camps Apache and Cherokee ran during those two summers. In 1977, Camp Apache was placed in conservation status and Camp Pequot was re-opened. However, for 1979, Long Rivers Council management changed its plan and decided to keep Camps Pequot and Cherokee open permanently. For 1981, Camp Cherokee's patrol cooking operation was moved to Camp Pequot, as an option for troops who preferred this. Thus, while still a reservation of multiple camps, by the 22nd year of operation of LOISR, only Camp Pequot remained as a summer camp.

The summer camp season also shortened as time went on. In the 1960s, both Pequot and Apache opened for eight weeks of summer camp use. By the mid-1970s, this was down to six weeks for Camp Apache. By the late seventies, Camp Pequot was only open for summer camping three weeks out of the summer. With the closure of Camp Cherokee after the 1980 season, Camp Pequot's season expanded back to five weeks.

With the construction of the Mashantucket Pequot Casino in 1991–1992, the natural beauty and surroundings had been damaged enough to make Long Rivers Council consider selling the property to the Native American tribe and this was done in 1992. The Mashantucket nation has since converted the land into a golf course.

====== Camp Apache – Lake of Isles Scout Reservation ======
Camp Apache had the largest capacity of the three camps, serving as many as 400 Scouts a week at its height in the late 1960s and early 1970s. It had a large dining hall and a huge reservation chapel. It also was closest to the reservation entrance on the western shores of Lake of Isles. The Reservation Family Housing (on "Knob Hill") and the Reservation Health Lodge were also located in Camp Apache.

In 1975 and 1976, Camp Apache ran for the last time during two summer seasons. In 1977, it was placed in conservation status and was never opened again as a Boy Scout Camp. Occasionally, it was rented by other groups and Scouts would continue to use Camp Apache for short-term Camporees and other district events. However, the reservation itself was not within the geographic boundary of Long Rivers Council, making other Council camps closer to the Council membership. Thus, Camp Apache was never used as much as it could have been.

====== Camp Pequot – Lake of Isles Scout Reservation ======
Camp Pequot was the southernmost camp on the reservation. It was mainly flat along the shoreline with a rapid rise of hills on the western side of the camp. It had a dining hall which served as many as 350 Scouts a week during the camp's heyday in the late 1960s and early 1970s. It was only slightly smaller than Camp Apache. The camp had an outdoor basketball court, which was rather unusual for most camps. Originally, the camp had eight summer campsites. Down on the flat, it included Buccaneers, Aquanauts, Mohegan, Woodsmen and Rocky Trails. The "higher elevation" campsites included Stockade, Bailey Hill and Hickory Hill. Later, Blueberry Hill was developed. Even later, the staff's central campsite, near the dining hall, was converted to a campsite called Braves, with the staff lodging being dispersed so that they lived near their program areas. The Braves campsite was mainly used for boys who wanted to come to camp, but no adult leader from their troop could. The camp staff would "provide" the adult leadership and thus the campsite was for what was known as the "provisional" troop.

In the mid-1970s, the plan for LOISR was to close Camp Pequot for two years and run Camp Apache for two years, then switch the status of the camps for the following two years. So in 1975 and 1976, Camp Pequot was placed in "conservation status" and Camps Apache and Cherokee ran during those two summers. In 1977, Camp Apache was placed in conservation status, and Camp Pequot was re-opened. However, for 1979, Long Rivers Council management changed its plan and decided to keep Camps Pequot and Cherokee open permanently. By 1981, Camp Cherokee's patrol cooking operation was moved to Camp Pequot, as an option for troops who preferred this. Thus, while still a reservation of multiple camps, only Camp Pequot remained as a summer camp.

The summer camp season also shortened as time went on. In the 1960s, Pequot opened for eight weeks of summer camp use, which was reduced by the end of the 1970s to only three weeks. However, with the closure of Camp Cherokee after the 1980 season, Camp Pequot's season expanded back to five weeks.

====== Camp Cherokee – Lake of Isles Scout Reservation ======
Camp Cherokee opened in 1970. This camp was designated an "Explorer Base" at first and featured patrol cooking with a central commissary. However, the designation as an Explorer Base quickly disappeared, as Exploring became more vocationally oriented in the early 1970s, especially in Connecticut with its Police Explorer Posts. Camp Cherokee was the only camp opened on the eastern shores of Lake of Isles, which had been formed by damming a small stream. The original channel ran through the Camp Cherokee waterfront, making the drop-off between the non-swimmers' area and the beginners' area huge.

At Camp Cherokee, campsites were further subdivided into patrol sites. Each patrol site had a sheepherders stove and wall tents on wooden platforms with bunks and mattresses provided. Scouts would have to make the trek to the commissary three times a day to pick up food for breakfast, lunch and dinner, and then cook it themselves. This was the logical camp in the council to hold Youth Leader Training, whether it was called JLTC, TLD or TLTC, as it had the patrol cooking arrangements. There were six troop sites throughout Camp Cherokee's history: Sassafrass Hill, Timbertrails, Haven, Wilderness, Tunxis and Pyquag.

Camp Cherokee had all the usual program features for Scouting: a nature area, a waterfront, a place to practice scoutcraft, a rifle range and an archery range. The lower part of the camp, along the Lake of Isles shoreline, included the campsite Tunxis, the nature area and the waterfront. It was a steep climb up to the rest of the camp, which included the trading post/camp office and commissary and the other five campsites. Some needed amenities were provided at the Reservation level, such as a health lodge and lodging for families of married staff.

From 1970 until 1978, Camp Cherokee was open the same weeks as the other camps, which allowed some friendly competition between camps on opposite sides of the lake, reaching from softball games to a tug of war. Most popular was a battle between "war canoes", where two 12-plus person canoes, representing each camp, headed out on the lake, determined to swamp each other by splashing water into the opponents' canoe. Another favorite activity was to out-shout the other camp during campwide campfires on Sunday evening and Friday evening.

In 1979 and 1980, with continuing declining attendance, Camp Cherokee was open for only three weeks, followed by Camp Pequot for the next three weeks. This allowed the same staff to be hired for both camps. By 1981, Camp Cherokee's patrol cooking operation was moved to Camp Pequot. Thus, despite being the most modern facility on the Reservation, Camp Cherokee was closed for good as a Boy Scout summer camp.

==== Derby Council ====
The headquarters of Derby Council #069 was in Derby, Connecticut. The first Scout troop, Troop 1, was formed in Derby in 1911. Derby Council was formed in 1918 as a Second Class Council. The Council changed its name to Housatonic Council in 1923 when it became a First Class Council (see above).

==== Eastern Connecticut Council ====
Eastern Connecticut Council #076, was headquartered in Norwich, Connecticut. The Council came about from a name change of North New London Council in 1929. The Council ceased operations when it merged with Pequot Council to create the Indian Trails Council in 1971.

===== Uncas Lodge =====
Uncas Lodge #297 was the OA lodge for the Eastern Connecticut Council. Their name comes from the son of Chigachgook. Their totem is a fox. The lodge ceased its operation with its merger with Samson Occum #338 to form Sassacus Lodge #10.

===== Camp Quinebaug =====
This camp was operated by the Eastern Connecticut Council from 1943 to 1963. It was sold and the operation was moved to the much larger June Norcross Webster Scout Reservation in 1964.

==== Fairfield County Council ====
Headquartered in Norwalk, Connecticut, Fairfield County Council #068 was created in 1972 with the merger of three Councils: Mauwehu, Pomperaug and Alfred W. Dater. The Council ceased operations when it later merged with Quinnipiac Council to form Connecticut Yankee Council in 1998.

===== Camp Aquila =====
The camp was located in Sherman. It was owned by the Fairfield County Council and home of Tankiteke OA lodge. Its original name was Camp Mauwehu and was the Mauwehu Council's summer camp. Located on the shores of Candlewood Lake, Camp Aquila was sold off by the council in 1984; once the center of Fairfield County Council's outdoor program, it is now home to a small number of residences.

===== Camp Pomperaug =====
The original Camp Pomperaug (Bridgeport Council, and Pomperauag council) was located along the shores of Lake Zoar when in 1919 the Bridgeport Rotary acquired land and opened for summer camp in 1922. When the dining hall roof collapsed in 1941, that camp was closed. A new Camp Pomperaug was created in Union, CT on Wells Pond, and opened in 1952. Previously operated by Fairfield County Council and supported by Tankiteke lodge until their merger into Connecticut Yankee Council. The last season of Summer camp in Union was 1974, but still open for troop camping and council events. The camp was closed and scheduled to be released in 2022.

===== Tankiteke Lodge =====
Tankiteke Lodge 313 was the OA lodge of Fairfield County Council. Their name translates to "those of slight stature." Their lodge totem is a hoop of the universe. The lodge was created 1973 with the merger of Mauwehu Lodge #389, Chief Pomperaug Lodge #408 and Ponus Lodge #521. In July 1972 the acting Area Chief, Jim Wardwell, brought the four lodges whose councils were to be merged in order to discuss how to merger the vibrant lodges into one (Achewon Netopalis Lodge #427 withdrew when its council decided not to be part of the merger). After several months of discussion, the three lodges held a tri-lodge dinner in December 1972. The membership voted on a new name, new lodge totem, new lodge constitution, new lodge by-laws and its first set of lodge officers. The new lodge was chartered in January 1973.

There were originally five chapters, corresponding to the six council districts: Owenoke (Stamford district), Pequot (Nutmeg District), Saganaw (Sachem and Oronoque districts), Sasqua (Sasqua district) and Scatacook (Scatacook district). In 1980, Sasqua and Owenoke chapters were merged to form Powahay chapter.

A dance team was formed in the Owenoke chapter and performed for local Scouting units, local lodges and appeared on local television report. The group won several competitions at annual section conclaves.

The lodge was also very active in section leadership, having been home to the first NE-1E Conclave Chief in 1974, and to the 1985 NE-1E Section Chief, Steve Burns of Danbury, who was elected after Steve Mimnaugh of Eluwak 59 was elected the 1985 National Chief. In one era in particular the lodge was home to several Section Chiefs in sequence, beginning in 1988 with Dave Turechek of Trumbull, who resigned partway through his term. Vice Chief George Oldroyd of Bridgeport, served as Acting Section Chief through the remainder of that term and was elected Section Chief at the conclave in 1989, serving through 1990. Sean Oldroyd, also of Bridgeport, served as his brother's Section Secretary, and was elected Section Chief when his aged out. He was elected two years in succession before being elected Northeast Region Chief, Then Pat Sullivan of Trumbull was elected and multiple terms.

(The Oldroyd brothers were thought to have been the first brothers to serve back-to-back terms as Section Chief in the Order's history, and it is noteworthy that the Pinnavaia brothers of Shu-Shu-Gah Lodge 24, who also served as Section Chiefs several years later, belonged to the same section, NE-3A.)

Sean Oldroyd was elected Northeast Region Chief in 1991. To commemorate this milestone, Tankiteke Lodge produced a special two-per-life lodge flap bearing the legend "HOME OF THE NORTHEAST REGION CHIEF". In 1994, Oldroyd became the lodge's first recipient of the Distinguished Service Award. Oldroyd was presented the DSA by Tom Reddin, his former Region Chairman.

Pat Sullivan also received the DSA in 1996.

The lodge merged with Arcoon Lodge 369 to form Owaneco Lodge 313 in 1999.

==== Hartford Council ====
Hartford Council #070 was headquartered in Hartford, Connecticut. It was founded in 1915 and changed its name to Charter Oak Council in 1933.

==== Indian Trails Council ====
Indian Trails Council #073, headquartered in Norwich, Connecticut, was formed with the merger of the Pequot Council and the Eastern Connecticut Council in October 1971. The Council owned several camps during its existence: Camp Wakenah (sold in 2004), Cochegan Rock (sold in 2006 to the Mohegan Tribe), Camp Quinebaug (sold in 1965) as well as June Norcross Webster Scout Reservation. The council's Order of the Arrow Lodge was the Sassacus Lodge #10. The districts were Quinebaug, Natchaug, Mohegan and Pequot. On January 1, 1995, the Indian Trails Council (Norwich) merged with the Long Rivers Council (Hartford) to form the Connecticut Rivers Council #66 (East Hartford).

In its history, three Scout Executives served Indian Trails Council. These were J. Lawrence Deveau (1971–1975), Anthony Booth (1976–1984) and Lawrence V. Pegg (1985–1995).

===== Sassacus Lodge =====
Sassacus Lodge #10 was the OA lodge of the Indian Trails Council. Their name is derived from Sassacus who was a Pequot Chieftain. Their totem is a war club. The lodge was created by the merger of Uncas #297 and Samson Occum #388 in 1971. The lodge received its first charter under its new name on January 1, 1972, and ceased operation in 1995 when it merged with Eluwak #59 to form Tschitani #10. In the fall of 1995, a joint lodge conclave with Eluwak #59 was held at June Norcross Webster Scout Reservation in Ashford. This was the last event that Sassacus Lodge #10 held. On September 17, 1995, the membership of both lodges voted for a new lodge name, totem, by-laws and slate of officers.

==== Keemosahbee Council ====
Keemosahbee Council #073, was headquartered in New Britain, Connecticut. The Council came about from a name change of New Britain Council in 1953. In 1967, the Council merged with the Bristol Council to form the Nathan Hale Council.

Keemosahbee Lodge #234 was the OA lodge for the New Britain Council (1943–1953) until the Council changed its name to Keemosahbee Council. The totem is a winged teal. The lodge was founded in 1943 and ceased operations when it merged with Woapalane #471 to form Wihungen #234.

===== Camp Keemosahbee =====
Camp Keemosahbee straddles the Eastford/Woodstock line on Crystal Lake. It was operated by the Keemosahbee Council in 1916, which served the New Britain area, until the Council merged to become the Nathan Hale Council in 1967. It operated under the Keemosahbee name until it was renamed Nahaco to reflect the new Council (Nathan Hale Council).

The three combinations of the camp's name and Council are represented in the main dining hall as enlarged wooden versions of the camp patches. Other amenities, such as the camp's chapel and one of three winter shelters, reflect its original Keemosabee name. The camp distinguishes itself from others in Connecticut by using permanent Klondike-style shelters in lieu of the more common canvas platform tents.

After a series of Council mergers, the camp came into the ownership of the Connecticut Rivers Council, which hosted a Junior Leader Training Camp and a water sports merit badge camp at the site until it was sold in 2003 to the towns of Eastford and Woodstock. The towns have permanently preserved 120 acres (0.5 km^{2}) of the camp's sparsely developed woodlands for hiking and camping, while maintaining the remaining land along Crystal Lake (including the camp center, sports field, dining hall and other camp buildings) for rental, picnicking and sports use. The Camp Nahaco Commission, which operates the camp on behalf of the two towns, also hosts a day camp program for area children.

According to the town of Eastford website, the commission is dedicated to maintaining Camp "Nahaco and its facilities" and "preserving the natural beauty [that] Camp Nahaco affords".

Also see Woodstock Conservation Commission for further information about the camp's preservation and Eastford Recreation Page for policy information on use of Nahaco's facilities.

==== Long Rivers Council ====
Long Rivers Council #066 was headquartered in Hartford, Connecticut. The council was formed in 1972 with the merger of five councils (Charter Oak, Mattatuck, Middlesex County, Nathan Hale and Tunxis). The Council then merged with Indian Trails Council in 1995 to create the Connecticut Rivers Council.

===== Eluwak Lodge =====
Eluwak Lodge #59 was the OA lodge of Long Rivers Council. Their name translates to "most powerful one" in Lenape. Their totem is five rivers merging. The lodge was created in 1973 from the merger of Kiehtan #59, Mattatuck #217, Wihungen #234, Tunxis #491 and Wipanquoak #558. The lodge ceased its operation in 1995 after merging with Sassacus #10 to form Tschitani #10.

==== Manchester Township Council ====
Manchester Township Council #068, headquartered in Manchester, Connecticut, was founded in 1917. The Council ceased operations in 1925.

==== Mattatuck Council ====
Mattatuck Council #080 was headquartered in Waterbury, Connecticut. The Council came about from a name change of Waterbury Council in 1935, when it absorbed Naugatuck Council. In 1972, the Council ceased to exist when it merged with Charter Oak, Middlesex County, Nathan Hale and Tunxis to form Long Rivers Council.

Mattatuck Lodge #217 was the OA lodge for Mattatuck Council. Their name, from an Algonquian language, is translated as "land of few trees". The lodge totem is an arrowhead with crossed arrows. The lodge was founded in 1942 and ceased operations in 1973 with the merger of Kiehtan #59, Wihungen #234, Tunxis #491 and Wipunquoak #558 to form Eluwak #59.

===== Camp Mattatuck =====
Camp Mattatuck is located in Plymouth, Connecticut. Mattatuck Council purchased 170 acres (0.7 km^{2}) in 1938 and the camp opened the following year. The original 170 acres (0.7 km^{2}) included wooded areas, open fields and Lake Kenosha. The first campsites were built overlooking the lake on the west. Additional properties were purchased to comprise the 500 acres (2.0 km^{2}) camp today.

Camp Mattatuck offers a wide range of activities for the Scouts including mountain biking, rock climbing, sail boating, canoeing, kayaking, rifle and shotgun shooting, swimming and lifesaving. The camp is used to host a Cub Scout Day Camp and the resident Scouts BSA camp and serves about 1,000 Scouts and 500 Cub Scouts each summer. Six cabins on the camp grounds also allow for winter camping.

==== Mauwehu Council ====
The headquarters of Mauwehu Council #075 was in Ridgefield, Connecticut. The Council came about from a name change of Mid Fairfield Council in 1952. In 1972 the Boy Scout Councils of Alfred W. Dater, Mauwehu and Pomperaug voted to consolidate their operations into a new Council and the Council ceased operations and the new one, Fairfield County Council, began its history.[6]

Mauwehu Lodge #389 was the OA lodge for the Mauwehu Council. Their name comes from a chief of a local Native American tribe. Their totem was the gray wolf. The lodge was founded in 1948 and ceased its operations when it merged with Chief Pomperaug #408 and Ponus #521 to form Tankiteke Lodge #313 in 1972.

===== Camp Mauwehu =====
Camp Mauwehu was the summer camp for the council.

===== Tuccio Scout Camp =====
The camp was built in Ridgefield on land donated by Jerry Tuccio on Pine Mountain Road.

===== Camp Brown =====
About 10 acres (40,000 m^{2}) in New Canaan off of Valley Road, had a pond.

==== Meriden Council ====
Meriden Council #071, was headquartered in Meriden, Connecticut. Founded in 1915, it changed its name to Central Connecticut Council in 1929.

==== Mid Fairfield Council ====
Mid Fairfield Council #075 had its headquarters in Norwalk, Connecticut. The Council came about from a name change of Central Fairfield Council in 1935.

==== Middlesex County Council ====
Middlesex County Council #674, headquartered in Middletown, Connecticut, was founded in 1924 and ceased its operation when the Council merged with four other Councils (Charter Oak, Mattatuck, Nathan Hale and Tunxis) to form Long Rivers Council in 1972.

Three camps belonged to Middlesex County Council, which were White Mountain Camp, Camp Kiehtan (which was at various locations in the 1930s and 1940) and Camp Tadma (which was also known as the Mark Greer Scout Reservation; 1947–1972).

===== Kiehtan Lodge =====
Wahquimacut Lodge #59 was the OA lodge for Middlesex County Council. Their lodge totem was a pine tree. The lodge was founded in 1931, but disbanded for a number of years before re-chartering in 1957 as Kiehtan #59.

Kiehtan Lodge #59 was the OA lodge for Middlesex County Council. Their name translates to "spirit of the southwest" in Natick. Their totem is of a Native American feeding a beaver. The lodge was founded in 1931 as Wahquimacut, but disbanded for a number of years before re-chartering in 1957 as Kiehtan. In 1972, the lodge merged with Mattatuck #217, Wihungen #234, Tunxis #491 and Wipanquoak #558 to form Eluwak #59.

===== Camp Tadma / Mark Greer Scout Reservation =====
After World War II, the Council looked to build a permanent camp for its troops. Land surrounding Tadma pond was for sale, and was purchased. The camp was developed enough to have a summer season in 1947. With five camp sites, a small dining hall, waterfront, health lodge, chapel, shower house and rifle range, it had all the amenities of a typical Scout camp of the time. Mark Greer was a major benefactor of the Middlesex County Council, and the planned reservation was named in his honor. After the major merger of five councils to form the Long Rivers Council, the plans for additional camps on the undeveloped east side were scrapped. Camp Tadma's last season as a Scout camp was 1976. It re-opened as a Webelos long-term camp (one of the first in the country) in 1978. It continues as a Webelos camp and as a Cub Day Camp with the move of Camp Wakenah to the Mark Greer Scout Reservation property in 2004. The summer camp closed after the 2012 season and was sold in 2015 to a local church.

==== Nathan Hale Council ====
Nathan Hale Council #072 was headquartered in New Britain, Connecticut. The Council came about from a merger of Bristol Council and Keemosahbee Council in 1967. The Council merged with four other councils (Charter Oak, Mattatuck, Middlesex County and Tunxis) to form Long Rivers Council in 1972.

===== Wihungen Lodge =====
Wihungen Lodge #234 was the OA lodge for the Nathan Hale Council. Their name means "to sacrifice." The lodge totem is a Grand Union flag. The lodge was created from the merger of Keemosahbee #234 and Woapalane #471 in 1968. The lodge ceased its operation in 1973 with its merger of Kiehtan #59, Mattatuck #217, Tunxis #491 and Wipunquoak #558 to form Eluwak #59.

===== Camp Nahaco =====
The camp was founded in 1916 as Camp Keemosabee by the New Britain Area Council. Located on Weeks Road on the banks of Crystal Pond, in both Eastford and Woodstock, Connecticut, the 134-acre (0.5 km^{2}) camp was the Scout camp for four different Councils over its long history: originally New Britain Area Council, then Nathan Hale Council, Long Rivers Council and finally Connecticut Rivers Council. A feature most remembered of the camp is its lagoon, separated from the rest of Crystal Pond by the Causeway (bridge) and the points of the Scout Law painted on the steps at the beach that lead to the swimming area.

The merge of two former councils (the New Britain Area Council and the Bristol Area Council) into the Nathan Hale Council in 1968 come up with the amalgam of Camp NAthan HAle COuncil — NA-HA-CO : NAHACO. The entrance gate truss pattern spells out NAHACO. By 1972, the Nathan Hale Council became Nathan Hale District, but the camp still enjoyed keeping the name Nahaco in the newly formed Long Rivers Council.

A program pavilion was soon converted to a winter shelter that bears the name of Keemosabee. In 1981, another program pavilion that shares the parade field with the Keemosabee Shelter, was converted to a winter shelter and named in honor of Camp Cochipianee, which had been sold by the new Long Rivers Council. In the 1990s, the Highland District's fundraising put a lot of time and money into Nahaco, with improvements of updating the Dining Hall kitchen with all new stainless steel. It was then when the third and final program activity pavilion was converted into a winter shelter, then named the Highland Shelter. The deteriorated camp office was razed at that time as well.

Nahaco saw its last year as a full summer camp facility in 1977. Although several Specialty Camp weeks have been run at the camp since 1977, it never regained its full-time summer camp use. It always was a favorite place for winter camping up until the mid-2000s.

A referendum vote was held by the towns of Woodstock and Eastford about the purchase of Camp Nahaco from Connecticut Rivers Council. The referendum, held on October 16, 2002, approved the plan and on March 3, 2003, the camp became town property. The two towns shared the $560,000.00 purchase price. Today, 120 acres (0.5 km^{2}) are now permanently protected from development and Boy Scouts of America is still allowed to use the property.

Please see Camp Keemosabee (a previous name) for additional information.

==== Naugatuck Council ====
Naugatuck Council #072 was headquartered in Naugatuck, Connecticut. Founded in 1917, the Council ceased operations when it was merged with Waterbury Council to form the Mattatuck Council in 1935.

==== New Britain Council ====
New Britain Council #073, headquartered in New Britain, Connecticut, was founded in 1916 and changed its name to Keemosahbee Council in 1953. It owned Camp Heinzman.

==== New Haven Council ====
The headquarters of New Haven Council #074 is in New Haven. With the Scouting movement starting in 1910, the New Haven Register reported on August 21, 1910, that the Lion and the Arrow Patrols were forming. New Haven Mayor Frank Rice, City Librarian Willis Stetson and Judge Albert McClellan Matthewson strongly supported the Scouting movement and in 1912 founded the New Haven Council of the Boy Scouts of America. In 1913, the council was reorganized as a Second Class Council. Two years later, in 1915, the council was incorporated as a First Class Council and hired Gilbert N. Jerome as the first Scout Executive. In 1929 the Council changed its name to Southern New Haven County Council.

==== New London Council ====
New London Council #077 was headquartered in New London, Connecticut. Founded in 1918, the name was changed to South New London County in 1923. In 1929, the name was changed back to New London Council and remained until a name change in 1935 to Pequot Council.

==== North New London Council ====
North New London Council #076 was headquartered in Norwich, Connecticut. The Council came about from a name change of Norwich Council in 1922 and changed its name again to Eastern Connecticut Council in 1929.

==== Northern Litchfield Council ====
Northern Litchfield Council #079 was headquartered in Torrington, Connecticut. The Council came about from a name change of Torrington Council in 1929. In 1947, the Council name was changed to Tunxis.

==== Norwalk Council ====
Norwalk Council #075, headquartered in Norwalk, Connecticut, was founded in 1917 and changed its name to Central Fairfield Council in 1933.

==== Norwich Council ====
Norwich Council #076, headquartered in Norwich, Connecticut, was founded in 1917. It changed its name to North New London Council in 1922. It owned Camp Tippecan.

==== Pequot Council ====
Pequot Council #077, headquartered in New London, Connecticut, came about from a name change from New London Council in 1935. The Council ceased its operations on October 1, 1971, with its merger with Eastern Connecticut Council to form Indian Trails Council.

===== Camp Cochegan =====
Camp Cochegan, also known as Cochegan Rock and Becker Memorial Scout Reservation, was a 92 acres (370,000 m^{2}) camp that was donated to the Pequot Council in 1963 by the family of Nathan and Ida Becker. The reservation has also been operated by the Indian Trails Council and most recently by the Connecticut Rivers Council. Cochegan Rock is believed to be the largest freestanding boulder in New England, 54 feet (16 m) long, 50 feet (15 m) high and 58 feet (18 m) wide. It weighs 10,000 tons.

The property has been transferred to the Mohegan tribe in exchange for a $1,000,000 contribution to the council's Capital Campaign. Tribal officials consider the rock an important piece of their heritage. 350 years ago, chief Uncas, who founded the Mohegan tribe and made peace with the colonists, may have held tribal councils there.

===== Samson Occum Lodge =====
Samson Occum Lodge #388 was the OA lodge for the Pequot Council. Their name comes from Samson Occom, a Mohegan Indian and an ordained Presbyterian minister. Their totem is a profile of a Mohegan Native American with a single feather.

===== Camp Wakenah =====
Camp Wakenah is the Boy Scouts of America's second oldest camp (however, the source of this claim is questioned). It was founded in around 1917 on Gardner Lake in Salem, Connecticut. The property was sold in the 1930s to buy the second Camp Wakenah at a different location on Gardner Lake which consisted of 34 acres (140,000 m^{2}).

In 1971, the Pequot Council (New London) merged with the Eastern Connecticut Council (Norwich) into the Indian Trails Council which had its office in New London. 1972 was the last resident camp season for Camp Wakenah. Despite the loss of the resident program, Wakenah was still used by troops for weekend camping and district events. The location was also used for a four-week Cub Scout day camp program.

Connecticut Rivers Council sold the property in 2004. Some in the area resented the sale for private use after the council had originally planned to sell the property to the town of Salem for $500,000.00. A bidding war resulted in the final $1,000,000.00 selling price.

The day camp program was moved to Camp Wakenah's new site in the Mark Greer Scout Reservation in Bozrah. The new site was located west of Camp Tadma on the common property, separated by the parking lot. Its parade field was near the top of the pine covered hill to the right of the property's main entrance. The parade field sat in a clearing that was originally made as a campsite. It was expanded to make room for a BB and Archery range for the day camp. Camp Wakenah "III" also made use of a newly constructed modular home that served as its administrative building and the existing Tadma Fort.

In 2009, Camp Wakenah expanded to encompass several other aspects of Camp Tadma, such as use of the newly constructed parade field, the dining hall for lunch, and the new Sherwood Forest area—in what had been the day camp parade field. In 2010, Camp Tadma and Camp Wakenah operate simultaneously, and use the same facilities, although programs are developed to maintain age-appropriateness.

==== Pomperaug Council ====
Pomperaug Council #065, was headquartered in Bridgeport, Connecticut. The Council came about from a name change of Bridgeport Council in 1936. In 1972 the Boy Scout Councils of Alfred W. Dater, Mauwehu and Pomperaug voted to consolidate their operations into a new Council and the Council ceased operations and the new one, Fairfield County Council, began its history.[6]

The Council owned Camp Scoutland.

===== Chief Pomperaug Lodge =====
Chief Pomperaug Lodge #408 was the OA lodge for the Pomperaug Council. Their name comes from Chief Pomperaug of the Pootatuck Native Americans. Their lodge totem is a panther. The lodge was founded in 1949 and ceased operations when it merged with Mauwehu #389 and Ponus #521 to form Tankiteke Lodge #313 in 1972.

==== Quinnipiac Council ====
Quinnipiac Council Patch

Quinnipiac Council #074, was headquartered in New Haven until 1961, when it moved to Hamden, CT. The Council came about from a name change of Southern New Haven County Council in 1935. The name Quinnipiac comes from the Native American tribe which occupied the area.

Originally formed in 1912 as the New Haven Council of the Boy Scouts of America, its headquarters was located in New Haven. After years of growth and expanding outside the boundaries of New Haven, the Council name was changed to Southern New Haven County Council in 1929. In 1935, the Council name was changed again to Quinnipiac Council. The Council absorbed the Central Connecticut Council in 1978. In 1997, the Council voted to merge with Fairfield County Council. After 85 years in existence, the Council ceased its operation on January 1, 1998, and became part of the Connecticut Yankee Council.

The council is most notable for its operation, which was a model for the rest of country. In 1943, Elbert K. Fretwell, Chief Scout Executive of the BSA, described Quinnipiac Council as an example to councils all over America for the high quality of the Scouting program being provided. Camp Sequassen was rated a double-A camp. In 1962, the Council hosted the first of many successful International Camporees. On July 4, 1962, Scouts from 14 countries assembled at Camp Sequassen.

During its existence, the Quinnipiac Council owned the follow camps: Camp Sequassen, New Hartford, Connecticut, Deer Lake Scout Reservation, Killingworth, Connecticut, Old Settlers Scout Reservation, Milford, Connecticut, and Wah Wah Tayysee Scout Reservation, Hamden, Connecticut.

This council was served by Arcoon Lodge #369 of the Order of the Arrow.

===== Chi Sigma Lodge =====
Chi Sigma Lodge #369 was the original OA lodge for Quinnipiac Council. Chi Sigma started in the Quinnipiac Council in 1934 as a Scout Camp Honor Society. There was never a totem developed for the lodge. When the Boy Scouts of America began encouraging local councils to switch from their honor societies to the Order of the Arrow, the membership voted to organize Chi Sigma Lodge in 1947. The lodge was assigned the number 369 on November 19, 1947. On Monday evening, December 29, a formal installation of the lodge was held at the Council offices. The name Chi Sigma was retained rather than a Native American name in honor of Sam Bogan, founder of the earlier organization. However, in 1951, the lodge changed its name to Arcoon.

===== Arcoon Lodge =====
Arcoon Lodge

Arcoon Lodge #369 was the OA lodge for Quinnipiac Council. The lodge was formerly known as Chi Sigma, when it changed its name in 1953. The name Arcoon means to "raccoon" in Algonquin. Their totem was a raccoon with a feather.

Eager to learn more about what the Order of the Arrow was and how it could better serve the Scouts of the council, lodge leadership attended an area meeting at Camp Collier in New Hampshire in 1951. Brothers from area lodges were exchanging patches with their lodge totems on them. A committee was formed in 1951 to look for an appropriate symbol for the new lodge. Many animals of the north eastern woods were considered for a totem. A selection committee finally came up with the suggestion that the raccoon be used. All agreed as the pesky raccoon was a friend to all campers at Camp Sequassen, being a frequent visitor to camp sites and food boxes. Having chosen an appropriate animal as a totem for the lodge, the committee turned to finding a new name, which was supposed to be symbolic of the Native American background of the Order of the Arrow. After careful research the word "Arcoon" was recommended. The committee voted to accept both new name for the lodge and the raccoon as its totem. A contest was set up for a patch design that would best represent the new totem. With the lodge having a new name and totem, application was made to the National Order of the Arrow Secretary for a name change. Final approval was received in late 1951. Chi Sigma Lodge was officially renamed Arcoon Lodge #369.

In 1977, Quinnipiac Council absorbed the operations of Central Connecticut Council. Their lodge, Wangunks Lodge #274 was also absorbed in the operations of Arcoon Lodge #369 and became a chapter.

Arcoon Lodge received numerous awards and recognition for its dance team during its history. The lodge received National Standard Lodge status numerous times, as well as garnering the E. Urner Goodman Camping Award in 1978. Many Lodge Offices went on to serve on Section Committees and Section Offices.

In 1998, Quinnipiac Council and Fairfield County Council voted to merge the two Councils to create the Connecticut Yankee Council. Arcoon Lodge #369 was merged with Tankiteke Lodge #313 to form Owaneco Lodge #313 of the Connecticut Yankee Council in 1999.

===== Old Settlers Scout Reservation =====
In 1955, Mrs. Garland sold 110 acres (0.4 km^{2}) of land in Milford, Connecticut, to the Quinnipiac Council. The camp was used for short-term camping and Cub Scout day camp. The Boy Scouts sold the property in the 1980s to be developed for business. The sale was mainly due to the local Council needing cash to maintain other camps that were in disrepair.

==== South New London County Council ====
South New London County Council #077 was headquartered in New London, Connecticut. The Council came about from a name change to New London Council in 1923. In 1929, the Council name was changed back to New London Council.

==== Southern New Haven County Council ====
Southern New Haven County Council #074, headquartered in New Haven, Connecticut, came about from a name change of the New Haven Council in 1929. The change was to represent the geography of the council. In 1935, the Council name was changed to Quinnipiac Council.

==== Stamford Council ====
The headquarters of Stamford Council #078 was in Stamford, Connecticut. An article in the Stamford Advocate from 1941 (Tercentenary Edition) stated that on March 22, 1912, the city's first Boy Scout Troop was being formed at the St. John's Episcopal Church. It was called Troop 5. By 1918, unofficial Wolf Cub packs appeared in Stamford.

As with most early Boy Scout Councils, they usually formed after local organizations started organizing Scout troops. Local citizens met on March 23, 1917, to discuss Scouting in both Stamford, Connecticut and Darien, Connecticut. In June, their application to the Boy Scouts of America was accepted and the Stamford Council was born.

The Council opened its first camp on property in Long Ridge during the summer of 1920. In 1922, the council camp, now named Camp Toquam, was located in Hunting Ridge on Holly's Pond and moved two years later to property in Ridgefield, Connecticut. The Council became incorporated on March 6, 1924.

During 1926 and 1927, plans were developed to buy property for a larger camp ground. Camp Toquam opened its 1928 season on the shores of Dog Pond in Goshen, Connecticut. In 1937, Alfred W. Dater died. Dater was council president from the first day and was instrumental in the organization of Boy Scouts in Stamford, Connecticut. On December 2, 1938, the Stamford Council was renamed in his honor as the Alfred W. Dater Council.

===== Five Mile River Camp =====
In 1947, John Sherman Hoyt gave the Council 18 acres (73,000 m^{2}) in Norwalk to be called the Five Mile River Camp used for short-term camping.

==== Torrington Council ====
Torrington Council #079 was headquartered in Torrington, Connecticut. Founded in 1918, it changed its name to Northern Litchfield Council in 1929.

===== Camp Workcoeman =====
Camp Workcoeman was established in 1924 and it's one of the oldest continuously operating Scout camps in the country. This tradition of Scouting continues today.

==== Tunxis Council ====
Tunxis Council #079, headquartered in Torrington, Connecticut, came about from a name change of Northern Litchfield Council in 1947. In 1972, the Council merged with Charter Oak, Mattatuck, Middlesex County and Nathan Hale to form Long Rivers Council.

===== Tunxis Lodge =====
Tunxis Lodge #491 was the OA lodge for the Tunxis Council. Their name translates to "little river" (Algonquin). Their lodge totem is a thunderbird. The lodge was founded in 1953 and ceased operations when it merged in 1973 with Kiehtan #59, Mattatuck #217, Wihungen #234 and Wipunquoak #558 to form Eluwak #59.

==== Waterbury Council ====
Waterbury Council #080, headquartered in Waterbury, Connecticut, was founded in 1915 and ceased to exist when it merged with Naugatuck Council to form the Mattatuck Council in 1935.

== Girl Scouts of the USA ==
The state of Connecticut historically has had over 50 Girl Scout councils since 1912. However over time they have all merged to form the one current council.

Girl Scouting in Connecticut
- Map of Girl Scout Councils in Connecticut

=== Girl Scouts of Connecticut ===
Girl Scouts of Connecticut serves more than 45,000 girls and is headquartered in Hartford, Connecticut. It covers all of Connecticut.

website: https://www.gsofct.org/

=== Current Camps ===
==== Camp An-Se-Ox ====
Camp An-Se-Ox is a day camp located in Oxford, Connecticut, on 55 acres. There are plans in the future to have it become a camp focused on accommodating girls of all abilities. Trail's end, Maple Hollow. Wishing Rock. Playscape. Robin's Rest. Rocky Hill. Sherwood Forest. Platform Tents. Cedar Glen. Shelter. Echo Vale. Spence Lodge. East Lodge. The Dell.

==== Camp Aspetuck ====
Camp Aspetuck is a day camp located on 16 acres (6.5 ha) of wooded land in Weston, Connecticut. Founded in 1939 on 12 acres (4.9 ha), it was a gift from Gustav Pfeiffer to Aspetuck Council. In 1950, the Council purchased four additional acres. Since 1947, a summer day camp has been running almost continuously, just missing three seasons of 1972, 1973, and 2020. Camp Aspetuck comprises two swimming pools, a wetland nature trail, an outdoor cooking shelter, two program shelters, A-frames and platform tents for 3-season camping as well as Conway Cabin for year-round camping and program use.

==== Camp Clatter Valley ====
Camp Clatter Valley is a day camp set up in part of the town-owned Clatter Valley Park in New Milford, Connecticut. Flag ceremonies, archery, canoeing in the pond, arts and crafts in the pavilion. There is no swimming available.

==== Camp Laurel ====
Camp Laurel is a resident camp located in Lebanon, Connecticut, and was acquired in 1955. Former spot of Camp CEO. Has a horse program. Camp Laurel will be closed and sold when Camp Yankee Trails is up and running.

==== Camp Merrie-Wood ====
Camp Merrie-Wood is a day camp located in Manchester, Connecticut. The Motto is "There is beauty and strength in our differences." Camp Merrie-Wood facilities include a Lodge, a playing field, and hiking trails. Units have pavilions to offer shelter for rainy day activities.

==== Camp Rocky Craig ====
Camp Rock Craig is located in Stamford, Connecticut. In 1963, the Girl Scout Council of Southwestern Connecticut began a search for a camp location that was closer to Stamford and the towns they serve. 26 acres (11 ha) of land was purchased in 1964 in Stamford, Connecticut, and a shelter was immediately built on the property. In 1965, a summer camp was opened. The Council camping committee had requested funding to have the meadow drained with final approval being received in 1973. Bulldozers began clearing and dredging the land and with the help of volunteer Girl Scouts, Boy Scouts and adults, and the meadow was completed. The property has rocks for climbing as well as trails, ponds, outdoor cooking facilities, outdoor camping shelters and restroom facilities, a sports field, multi-purpose cabin with kitchen and full bathroom, and other camp-related facilities. Council plans to study and evaluate this property to determine if it will be sold in the future.

==== Camp Yankee Trails ====
Camp Yankee Trails is a resident camp located in Tolland, Connecticut, on 362 acres of land. Named in a contest in 1959 by two girls, JoAnn Celeste from Meriden CT and Sue Robinson from Simsbury. Currently summer camp program is currently being run by the YMCA of Greater Hartford, however GSofCT plan to develop it as a premier destination for resident camp, and close Camp Laurel once it is up and running.

==== Merrie Bee Cabin ====
Old Norwalk Rd, New Caanan, Connecticut. Sponsored by the Town of New Canaan. Girl Scouts of New Canaan can use the cabin free of charge. There is a small fee for Girl Scouts of other towns.

=== Former Camps ===
These camps are closed, resting, or sold.

==== Camp Alice Merritt ====
Located in Hartland, Connecticut, Camp Alice Merritt was founded in 1937. Winsted Community Committee. Its closure date is unknown. The land was sold to the town of Hartland, Connecticut in 1992.

==== Camp Brownieland ====
Old Newtown Rd, Monroe, Conn. Day camp for 7 and 8 yr old Brownies. Adjacent to Camp Treeland for Juniors. Mondays each unit cooks their own lunch. Every Wednesday they would take a bus to Camp Trefoil for use of the pool.

==== Camp Candlewood ====
In Mar 2021 it was announced that this property would be sold. Summer camp will no longer be run, but the property can be reserved for use until it is sold.

Camp Candlewood is located on the shores of Lake Candlewood in New Fairfield, Connecticut. The 90-acre (36 ha) property was purchased in 1959 by the Girl Scout Council of Southwestern Connecticut. Lake Candlewood was created in 1932 by the Connecticut Light and Power Company as a power reservoir. The Council brought in the Girl Scout National Camp Consultants and it was decided to develop both a Day Camp and a Resident Camp at the site.

Because the council had lost its day camp program at Camp Fairlee to an industrial development in Danbury, Connecticut, it was decided to develop the site for a new day camp program. A road to the beach was bulldozed and the Candleberry Shelter was built prior to the opening of Day Camp in 1960.

In 1961, the Development Committee started on the Resident Camp. The first building was the Shelter (Yar-Sloop) and in 1962 Seniors camped in Round-up tents at what is now known as "Quite a Hill!" 1963 saw the infirmary building. It served as staff house, infirmary and kitchen for supplies. Sailboats were purchased and the first boating docks were put in. In 1964, additional buildings were erected, the Catamaran Shelter, Administration building (the Bridge) and showers. The Galley was added in 1965 and the boat house followed in 1968.

==== Camp Carlson ====
Camp Carlson Camp Carlson, 36 acres located in Bristol, Connecticut, was the site of a summer day camp program. The Motto was "New friends, lifelong memories." The last year summer camp ran was 2019. GS Council is planning on exiting the deed restricted property, which is not owned by GSOFCT, and closing the camp.

==== Camp Cedarcrest ====
Colchester, Conn - New London Local Council.

==== Camp Clare ====
Meriden, Conn - Hamburg Cove

==== Camp Deerlea ====
Burr St, Fairfield, Conn. Lot size: 3.72 Acres. Mildred and Hugh Allison donated the cabin and space for this Girl Scout day camp on their home property in Fairfield. Opened in 1957, and was still running in 1973. Was supposed to open in 1956, however the camp needed improvements of running water and sanitary facilities, so they collected donated equipment and the girls sold cookies to raise money. For Brownies and intermediate scouts of the Fairfield district. Five Units: Shadyland, Forest Haven, Oak Hill, and two others. In May 1988 the house was sold.

==== Camp Fairlee ====
Camp Fairlee was a day camp located in Danbury, Connecticut. A fire of unknown origin destroyed the lodge on May 22, 1955, causing damage estimated at more than $20,000. Much of the Girl Scout camping equipment was lost. Camp Fairlee was located off Wooster Heights, Danbury, on part of the Lee Farm owned by Mrs. Frederick F. Robinson, the former Josephine Lee.

==== Camp Francis ====
Camp Francis was located in Kent, Connecticut, and was one of the oldest Girl Scout Camps in the country. Purchased around 1922 from Eli C. Barnum, the camp sits upon 265 "spectacular acres" (106 ha) near the Blue Heron Pond. Stamford Local Council.

The property had vast trails, streams and brooks, a waterfall and Blue Heron Pond for swimming and boating. The camp was initially used for summer resident camp, but during its last years it had only been used for camping. There were several foundations from old buildings scattered around the property. The far side of Blue Herron Pond had pieces of iron slag scattered around the site of an old smith.

The Kent Land Trust began managing the camp as a conservation area in 2011 and bought the property in February 2014 for $1.5 million. The Kent Land Trust will maintain trails on the property for hiking, cross country skiing, and snow shoeing. They are planning on restoring the original post and beam lodge from the Barnum farm with the aid of the Kent Historical Society so they can open a small museum dedicated to Scouting history in the area.

==== Camp Houghland ====
Wallingford, Conn

==== Camp Iwakta ====
Camp Iwakta, resident camp located in Norfolk, Connecticut, was available for troop camping on a year-round basis. Used to be a Cadette and Senior Girl Scout camp. Offered primitive camping and horseback riding. 311 of 395 acres sold to the Norfolk Land Trust 2013. Remainder of camp to be divested.

==== Camp Katoya ====
Camp Katoya, (Sweet Pine/Balsam Fir) located in Milford, Connecticut, is the site of a summer day camp program. In other months, it is for troop camping activities. 57 acres of woodlands, one large and one small pond, a nature hut, a 40-station nature trail with a series of significant ridges running lengthwise through its center, Kiwantoya Office building, McCauley Program House (building built in 1930), and a newer pool (2014) with showers. Originally owned by Milford Council of Girl Scouts Inc. land was Quitclaimed to Housatonic Council on Sep 25, 1964 by Eben and Marjorie Woolley, and then to GS of CT Inc on Apr 15, 2008. Co-owned by GS of USA. "As part of the consideration of this deed, it is agreed that the grantee may not sell the premises herein conveyed unless two thirds of the registered Girl Scout adults from the city of Milford vote approval of the sale." Of the 57 acres, approximately one third of the acreage is owned by the City of Milford (Red Root Nature Trail with 10 stations) and the remainder is owned by the Girl Scouts of CT. Katoya is among the oldest Girl Scout Camps operating in Connecticut in 2018. Home of the Haunted Hike and whimsy bread. Camp Katoya's last functioning year was 2019. Closed for the summer in 2020 due to the pandemic, and announced it would be rested for 2021. As of Mar 2021, GS Council announced it will be selling the camp, along with other CT camps.

==== Camp Kenwood ====
Meriden, CT day camp

==== Camp Maria Pratt ====
Torrington, Conn. Sold to the Arc of Litchfield County, Inc. and is called Camp Moe (previously known as Camp LARC), a camp for all children with and without special needs.

==== Camp Morton ====
Queach Rd, Branford, Conn - New Haven Local Council.

==== Camp Murray ====
East Haven, CT. 52 acre camp. Ct Trails Council. Closed about 2006.

==== Camp Pattagansett ====
Camp Pattagansett was a day camp on Pattagansett Lake, located in southeastern Connecticut in the town of East Lyme, CT. Est.1937. Sold in the fall of 2020. 845' of waterfront including a beach. 4500 sq. ft Evelyn Metcalf lodge, caretakers house, tent platforms, climbing tower and cabins remain.

==== Camp Poughland ====
Wallingford/Meriden town line - est. 1941

==== Robertson Outdoor Center ====
Easton, Conn.

==== Camp Sprague ====
Jobs Pond, Portland, Conn - Middletown Local Council & New Britain Local Council.

==== Camp Sweetheart Lake ====
Stafford Springs, Conn - Stafford Springs Community Committee.

==== Camp Timber Trails ====
Camp Timber Trails was a 476-acre (193 ha) resident camp that used to be owned by the Girl Scouts of Connecticut, and located in the Berkshire Mountains of southwestern Massachusetts in the town of Tolland. It was sold on June 27, 2017, and is now managed by the LLC's Board of Managers, which rent it out to the public for events: Camp Timber Trails website. Timber Trails was opened by the Girl Scouts in 1968 and was used for year-round camping. It offered standard programs in aquatics (swimming, sailing, canoeing, rowing and kayaking), arts and crafts, low ropes challenge course, archery, drama and theatre, hiking and biking along with a variety of specialized programs that were added from year to year. It had a stable that was fit to accommodate 20 horses, which were cared for by campers and staff throughout the summer sessions. Throughout the year, the camp was maintained by a camp ranger and assistant ranger who resided on property.

==== Camp Treeland ====
Old Newtown Rd, Monroe, Conn. Day camp for 9 and 10 yr old Juniors. Adjacent to Camp Brownieland for 7-8 yr olds.

==== Camp Trefoil ====
Trefoil Dr off Spring Hill Rd, Trumbull/Stepney CT. (razed and developed into sports businesses, like Trumbull Sports Zone)- Bridgeport Local Council. Resident camp.

==== Camp Wequapauset ====
Waterville, Conn - Waterbury Local Council.

==== Camp Woodruff ====
Milford, Conn - Milford Community Committee

=== Former councils ===
The following merged in 2008 to form the current council:

- Connecticut Trails Council of Girl Scouts (1964–2008) formed by the merger of Blue Trails, Derby Shelton, Eastern Connecticut, Laurel Trails, New London Area and Middlesex Area councils. In 1995, Connecticut Yankee Council of Girl Scouts merged. The name was changed to Girl Scouts, Connecticut Trails Council in 1994.
- Connecticut Valley Girl Scout Council (1961–2008)
- Girl Scout Council of Northwestern Connecticut (?-2008)
- Girl Scout Council of Southwestern Connecticut (?-2008)
- Girl Scouts of Housatonic Council (1925–2008) AKA Pequonnock Council

The rest are older.

- Waterbury Council of Girl Scouts (1929/1936-1952) changed its name in 1952 to Waterbury Area Council of Girl Scouts (1952–1956) and again in 1956 to Blue Trails Council of Girl Scouts (1956–1964). It later merged to form Connecticut Trails Council.
- Derby-Shelton Girl Scout Council (1927–1964) merged to form Connecticut Trails Council.
- Girl Scout Council of Eastern Connecticut (1950–1964) merged to form Connecticut Trails Council.
  - Norwich Girl Scout Council (1930–1955) merged with Eastern Connecticut.
- Laurel Trail Council of Girl Scouts (1957–1964) merged to form Connecticut Trails Council.
  - New Haven Council of Girl Scouts (1922–1957 (merged to form Laurel Trail)) is owned by Camp Rolawila, which was located at Silver Sands in East Haven, Connecticut. It was opened in 1927.
  - Wallingford Girl Scout Council (1928–1957) merged to form Laurel Trail Council.
  - Cheshire Council of Girl Scouts (1947–1957) was split off from Waterbury and merged to form Laurel Trail Council.
  - Ansonia Council of Girl Scouts (?-1962) merged with Laurel Trail Council.
- New London Council of Girl Scouts (1918–1964) merged to form Connecticut Trails Council.
- Upper Middlesex Area Council (1949-?)
- Middletown Girl Scout Council (1929-?)
- Connecticut Yankee Council of Girl Scouts (?-1995) merged with Connecticut Trails.

Other councils

- Greater Hartford Girl Scouts (<1944-?)
  - Hartford Girl Scout Council (1920-?)
- Aspetuck Area Girl Scout Council
- Bridgeport Girl Scout Council
- Bristol Girl Scouts
- Central Litchfield County Girl Scout Council
- Danbury Area Council of Girl Scouts
- Enfield Community Committee Girl Scout Council
- Girl Scout Council of the Fortynightly Club of Madison Conn
- Girl Scout Council of Fairfield County
- Girl Scout Council of Naugatuck and Beacon Falls
- Glastonbury Girl Scout Council (merged into Connecticut Valley circa 1960)
- Guilford Girl Scout Council
- Greenwich Council of Girl Scouts
- Manchester Girl Scouts
- Meriden Girl Scout Council
- Middletown and Portland Girl Scout Council
- Milford Council of Girl Scouts
- New Britain Council of Girl Scouts
- Norwalk Girl Scout Association (?1920-?)
- Old Saybrook Girl Scout Council
- Ridgefield Girl Scout Council
- Stafford Springs Girl Scout Community Committee
- Stamford Area Association of Girl Scouts
- Stonington Connecticut Girl Scout Council
- Thompsville Community Committee of Girl Scouts
- Torrington-Litchfield Girl Scout Council
- Watertown Council of Girl Scouts
- Westport Girl Scouts
- Willimantic Council of Girl Scouts
- Wilton Connecticut Girl Scouts
- Winsted Area Girl Scouts
