= Reay E. Sterling Middle School =

- South Junior High School
- U.S. National Register of Historic Places
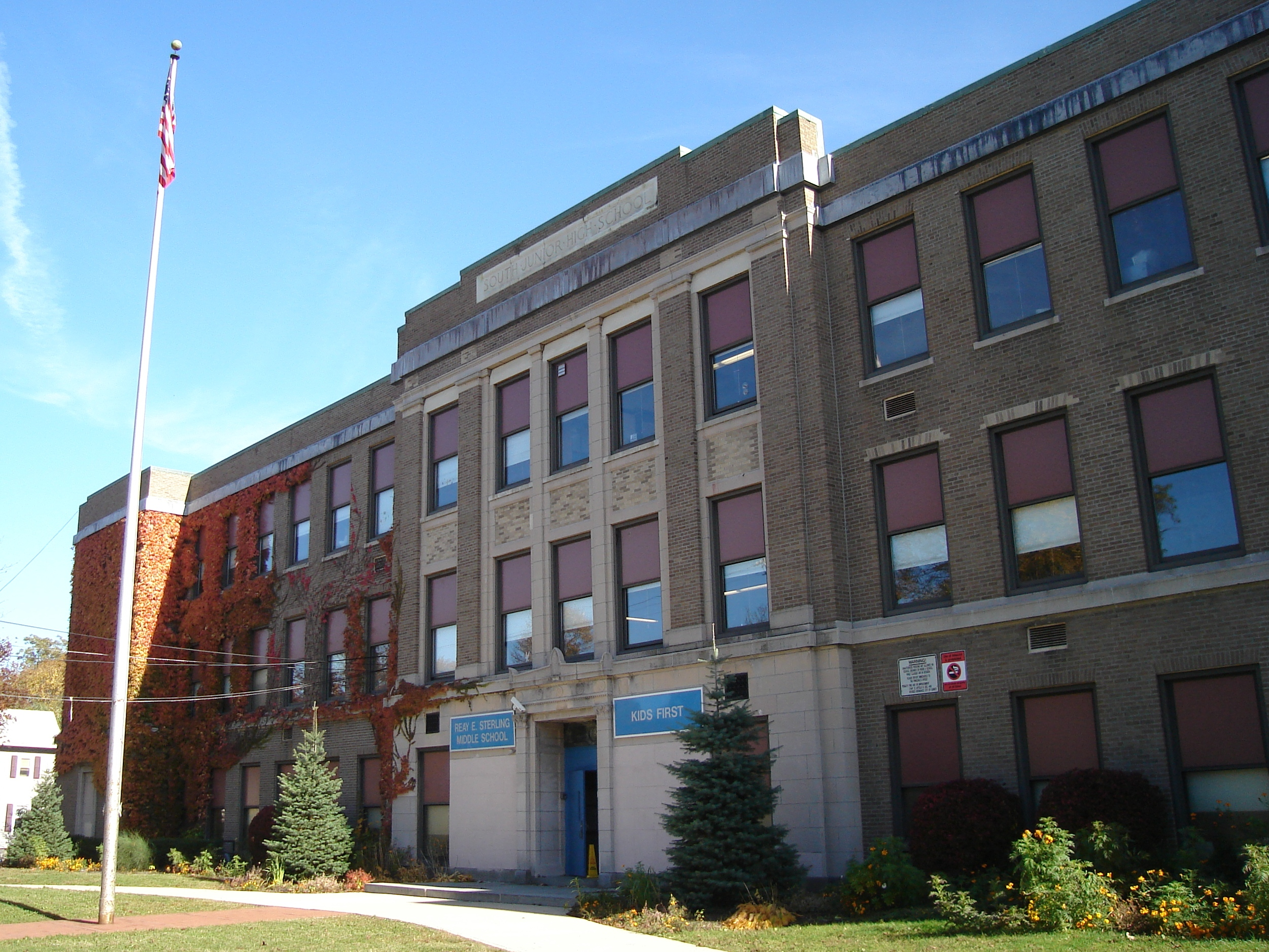

- Location within Massachusetts Location within the United States
- Location: 444 Granite St., Quincy, Massachusetts
- Coordinates: 42°14′24″N 71°0′59″W
- Area: 4.5 acres (1.8 ha)
- Built: 1927
- Architect: Shepard & Stearns
- Architectural style: Classical Revival
- MPS: Quincy MRA
- NRHP reference No.: 89001343
- Added to NRHP: September 20, 1989

The South~West Middle School, formerly the South Junior High School and Reay E. Sterling Middle School, is a state of the art school building at 444 Granite Street in Quincy, Massachusetts. It is part of the Quincy Public Schools.

The original school was in a Classical Revival style building designed by Shepard & Stearns and built in 1927. Prior to its demolition it was the best preserved of three junior high schools built by the city in the 1920s. It was a large U-shaped two-story brick building, with a flat roof and a raised basement. Its main facade was symmetrical, with slightly projecting end pavilions and a central entry pavilion.

The building was listed on the National Register of Historic Places in 1989. It was demolished in 2019 a month after the new school, behind the old building, was opened.

== See also ==
- National Register of Historic Places listings in Quincy, Massachusetts
