= Thomas University =

Private university in Thomasville, Georgia, US

Coordinates: 30.8160°N 83.9686°W

- Former names: Birdwood Junior College (1950–1976); Thomas County Community College (1976–1986); Thomas College (1986–2000)
- Type: Private university
- Established: 1950; 76 years ago
- Affiliations: Southern Association of Colleges and Schools Commission on Colleges
- President: Dr. John Meis
- Students: 1,012
- Location: Thomasville, Georgia, U.S.
- Colors: Hunter Green, Black & White
- Nickname: Night Hawks
- Sporting affiliations: NAIA – SSAC
- Website: thomasu.edu
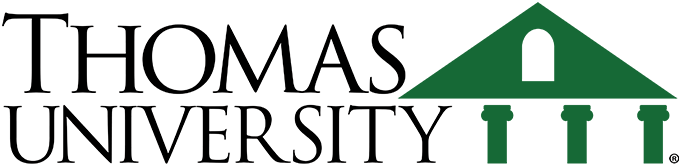

Thomas University is a private university in Thomasville, Georgia, United States. It offers associate, bachelor's, and master's degrees.

== History ==
The main building and grounds were originally a portion of Birdwood Plantation, the winter house of W. Cameron Forbes, U.S. Ambassador to Japan from 1930 to 1932 and Governor General of the Philippines from 1909 to 1913.

The Primitive Baptist Church purchased the property in 1949 and chartered "Birdwood Junior College" in 1950. Classes began in 1954 with nine students, and in 1956, three of these students became the first graduates. In 1976, the Primitive Baptists relinquished control, and the name was changed to "Thomas County Community College".

In 1979, the college became non-sectarian, private, and independent. In 1986, the name was changed to "Thomas College", and in 1988, the first four-year degree was offered.

In December 1998, Thomas College received approval from the Commission on Colleges of the Southern Association of Colleges and Schools (SACS) to move from Level II to Level III status, allowing Thomas College to offer graduate degrees.

In January 2000, Thomas College changed its name to "Thomas University". In the fall of 2013, Smith-Bonvillian Hall, TU's newest academic building, opened on the Forbes Campus. The 19,000-square-foot (1,800 m^{2}) building includes a state-of-the-art tiered classroom, faculty offices, and additional classrooms. In the fall of 2012, Thomas University opened its Magnolia Campus, which is located at the corner of Pinetree Boulevard and Magnolia Street in Thomasville about one mile from the main campus. The Magnolia Campus includes TU's gymnasium and new Student Life Center, which is home to the fitness center and athletic training room.

In December 2016, Southern Association of Colleges and Schools Commission on Colleges (SACSOC) placed Thomas University under Warning Status, despite having its accreditation reaffirmed.

== Campus ==
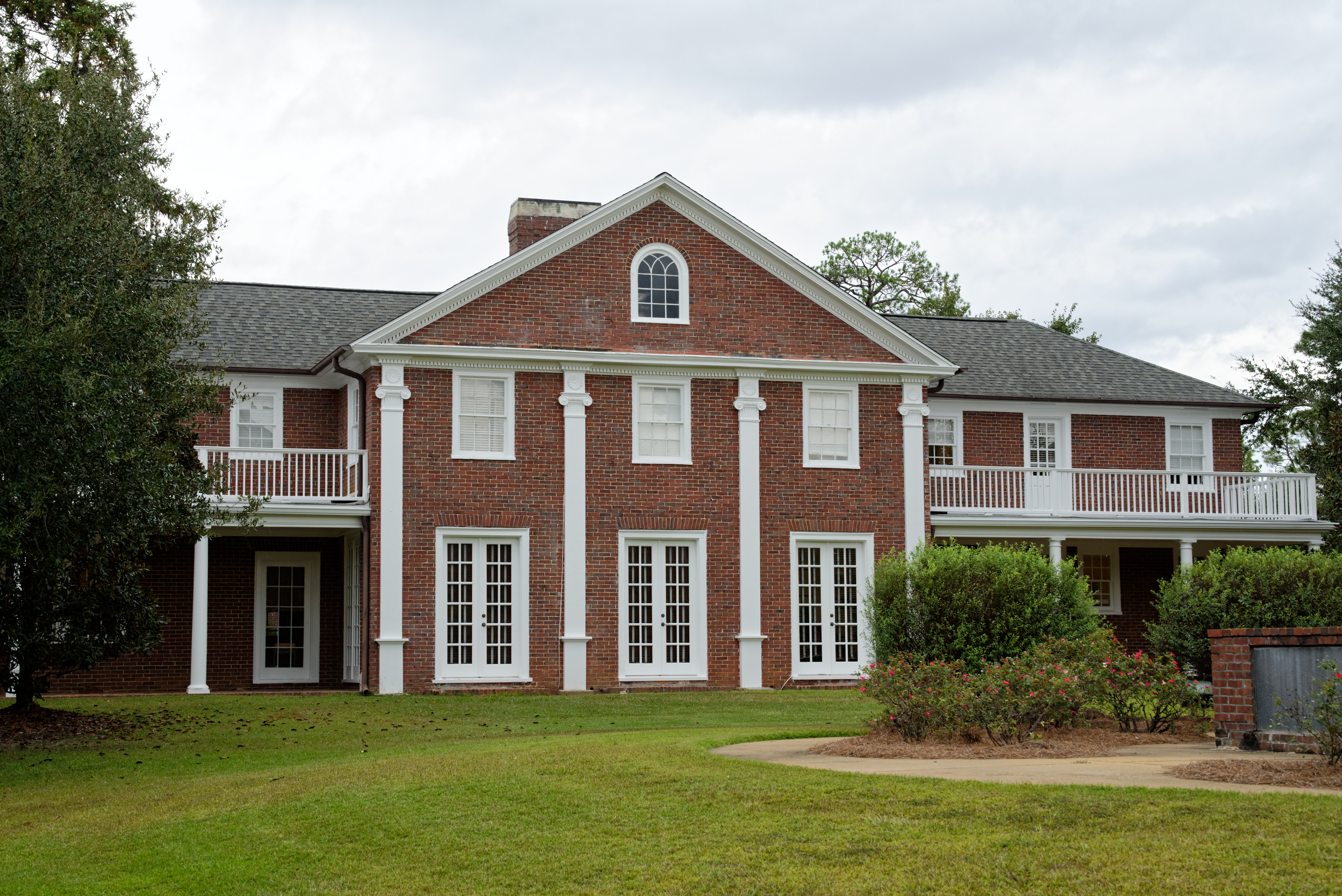
Forbes Hall/Birdwood

The twenty-nine acre Forbes Campus (located at the intersection of Pinetree Boulevard and Millpond Road) has now been augmented by a forty-five acre Magnolia Campus (located at the intersection of Magnolia Street and Pinetree Boulevard). Facilities at the Magnolia Campus include a gymnasium, athletic offices and training facilities. In the fall of 2016, the Magnolia Campus expanded to include additional classroom spaces, two residence halls, and a new soccer practice field.

== Faculty ==
After ten years of service, Dr. Gary Bonvillian was replaced as president by Dr. James Andrew Sheppard in July 2016. During Bonvillian's tenure, Thomas grew from 685 students to 1,182 (2015), more than doubled the size of the campus, and opened satellite campuses. In addition, he initiated international cooperative agreements with schools in China which have added about 1,000 students in China.

== Library ==
The Thomas University Library serves students and faculty, and includes a Learning Commons where students can receive tutoring. In 2017, the Thomasville Genealogical Library moved onto the Forbes Campus of Thomas University. The Genealogical Library is open to the public.

== Students ==
Thomas focuses on non-traditional students and high school students getting an early start through the Move On When Ready (MOWR) program. Over thirty per cent of the student body (and the majority of on-campus students) are athletes. As of the fall of 2017, TU had an enrollment of 1,202 students on campus and online.

== Athletics ==
The Thomas athletic teams are called the Night Hawks. The university is a member of the National Association of Intercollegiate Athletics (NAIA), primarily competing in the Sun Conference (formerly known as the Florida Sun Conference (FSC) until after the 2007–08 school year) since the 2012–13 academic year.

Thomas competes in 15 intercollegiate varsity sports: Men's sports include baseball, basketball, cross country, football, soccer, swimming and track & field, while women's sports include basketball, cross country, flag football, golf, soccer, softball, swimming and track & field.

On July 1, 2022, Thomas announced that they will leave the Sun Conference and they will join the Southern States Athletic Conference (SSAC), starting in the 2023–24 academic year.

=== Overview ===
Thomas University takes the Night Hawk as its nickname and mascot, and the school colors are Hunter Green and White. In 2004, the softball team won the NAIA national championship. In the 2013–14 season, basketball returned to Thomas after a 13-year hiatus. In the inaugural game, the Night Hawks men were victorious over visiting Florida National University by a score of 82–71.
