= List of St. Anthony Hall members =

St. Anthony Hall, also known as the fraternity of Delta Psi, was founded at Columbia University on January 17, 1847, and has eleven active chapters. The active chapters are Brown University, Columbia University, Massachusetts Institute of Technology (MIT), Princeton University, Trinity College, University of Mississippi, University of North Carolina at Chapel Hill (UNC), University of Pennsylvania, University of Rochester, University of Virginia (UVA), and Yale University.

Defunct chapters include Burlington College (New Jersey), Cumberland University, New York University, Randolph-Macon College, Rutgers College, South Carolina College, Washington and Lee University (W&L) and Williams College.

== Academia ==
Name	Original chapter	Notability	Ref.
Brown Ayres	W&L	president University of Tennessee	
E. Digby Baltzell	Pennsylvania	sociologist, academic, and author credited with popularizing the term WASP	
William Fincke	Yale	minister, founded Brookwood Labor College and the Manumit School, All-American football player	
Joel Sutton Kendall	Virginia	president North Texas Normal School (now University of North Texas)	
Frederick D. Losey	Rochester	head of rhetoric and public speaking, Syracuse University; professor, University of Alabama; elocutionist	
Brander Matthews	Columbia	first full-time professor of dramatic literature (aka drama) at an American university	
S. Frederick Starr	Yale	founder of Central Asia-Caucus Institute, president of Oberlin College	
C. A. L. Totten	Trinity	professor of military tactics, writer, and an early advocate of British Israelism	

== Architecture ==
Name	Original chapter	Notability	Ref.
Chester Holmes Aldrich	Columbia	architect, partner in Delano and Aldrich, Director of the American Academy in Rome	
Thomas H. Atherton	MIT	Architect, war memorials, and numerous armories and public buildings	
Henry Forbes Bigelow	MIT	architect, public and residential buildings in the Boston area	
Roger Bullard	Columbia	architect	
J. Cleaveland Cady	Trinity	architect, designer of Metropolitan Opera, American Museum of Natural History	
Duncan Candler	Columbia	architect, designer for John D. Rockefeller Jr. and Edsel Ford (Skylands)	
Stockton B. Colt	Columbia	architect designed the Emmett Building and the Barclay Building	
Rockwell King DuMoulin	Columbia	architect, professor, and department chair at the Rhode Island School of Design	
John Cameron Greenleaf	Yale	architect	
Andrew Hopewell Hepburn	MIT	architect, oversaw the restoration of Colonial Williamsburg	
Frank Howell Holden	MIT	architect, director of interior designs for Macy & Co. stores	
Edward Townsend Howes	Yale	architect, artist	
H. Mather Lippincott Jr.	Pennsylvania	architect of Philadelphia Yearly Meeting Friends Center, Fred W. Noyes Foundation Museum	
Emlen T. Littell	Pennsylvania	architect known for designing gothic revival style churches	
Goodhue Livingston	Columbia	architect of Hayden Planetarium, Knickerbocker Hotel, Rikers Island Penitentiary	
John Mauran	MIT	architect	
Henry G. Morse	MIT	architect	
George Carnegie Palmer	Columbia	architect of New York State Education Building and numerous college and public buildings	
Francis L. Pell	Columbia	architect of Maryland Institute building	
William G. Perry	MIT	architect responsible for the restoration of Colonial Williamsburg	
James Otis Post	Columbia	architect	
William Stone Post	Columbia	architect of the New York Stock Exchange and the campus plan, City College of New York	
Edmund R. Purves	Pennsylvania	architect, executive of American Institute of Architects, WWI Croix de Guerre and Verdun Medal	
William Hamilton Russell	Columbia	architect of New York City's Beaver Building, Mecca Masonic Temple and The Langham	
Peter L. Shelton	Pennsylvania	architect, winner of the Cooper Hewitt Smithsonian Design Museum National Design Award	
Fletcher Steele	Williams	landscape architect	
Samuel Breck Parkman Trowbridge	Trinity	architect, designer of the current New York Stock Exchange on Wall Street	

== Arts ==
Name	Original chapter	Notability	Ref.
Winslow Ames	Columbia	art historian, author, academic, and director of the Museum of Modern Art	
Bill Bamberger	UNC	documentary photographer	
James Bohannon	Trinity	member of the band VHS Collection	
Morgan Colt	Columbia	Metal worker, furniture craftsman, impressionist, architect, and co-founder of New Hope Group	
John Eaton	Yale	jazz pianist and originator of John Eaton Presents the American Popular Song on PBS	
Harold Perry Erskine	Williams	scultpor and architect	
Wilson P. Foss Jr.	Yale	art collector and dealer of Asian art, chairman of New York Rock Trap Company	
John Humphreys Johnston	Columbia	artist	
Anya Liftig	Yale	Performance artist and memoirist	
Charles Green Shaw	Yale	artist, a significant figure in American abstract art, novelist, poet, journalist, and writer	
Allen Butler Talcott	Trinity	artist	
David Urquhart Wilcox	Yale	artist, illustrator, and teacher	
John Rhea Barton Willing	Pennsylvania	music enthusiast and violin collector, included in Ward McAllister's "Four Hundred"	

== Business and industry ==
Name	Original Chapter	Notability	Ref.
Bill Backer	Yale	advertising executive and lyricist, created "I'd Like to Teach the World to Sing" Coca-Cola campaign	
Hans W. Becherer	Trinity	president and CEO of John Deere	
Henry Becton	Yale	chairman and executive vice president of Becton Dickinson and Company	
Marshall Latham Bond	Yale	mining engineer, Jack London's landlord in during the Klondike Gold Rush	
Jonathan Bryan	Virginia	President of the Richmond-Ashland Railway Company, president of Bryan, Kemp & Co. brokerage firm	
George H. Bull	Columbia	president of the Saratoga Racing Association and the Empire City Race Track	
William E. Carter	Pennsylvania	stockbroker, polo player, Titanic survivor	
Frank Hamilton Clark	Pennsylvania	president of the Lake Superior and Mississippi Railroad	
Martin W. Clement	Trinity	president of the Pennsylvania Railroad Company from 1935 to 1948	
Robert Habersham Coleman	Trinity	Gilded Age "Coal King," scion of the family that owned the Cornwall Iron Furnace	
Harry B. Combs	Yale	aviation pioneer, founder of Combs Aviation, and president of Gates Learjet Corporation	
Henry M. Crane	MIT	consulting engineer General Motors, vice president and chief engineer Crane-Simplex	
Russ Dallen	Mississippi	economist, head of Oppenheimer & Co. in Venezuela, editor of The Daily Journal and the Latin American Herald Tribune	
Alfred Dater	Yale	Vice chairman Connecticut Power Company, general manager, and chairman of Stamford Gas & Electric	
Clarence B. Davison	Yale	director of New York Coffee and Sugar Exchange	
D. LeRoy Dresser	Columbia	banker, merchant, brother-in-law of George Washington Vanderbilt II	
James F. Fargo	Williams	president of American Express, originated traveler's check system	
Stuyvesant Fish	Columbia	president of the Central Illinois Railroad	
Wilson P. Foss Jr.	Yale	Board chairman of New York Rock Trap Company, art collector, dealer of Asian art	
Gregory Gray Garland Jr.	Virginia	chairman of Pittsburgh and Lake Erie Railroad, owner of Unionvale Coal Company and Youngstown Steel Tank	
Schuyler Hamilton Jr.	Columbia	brick manufacturer, mining engineer, architect	
Colin M. Ingersoll, Jr.	Yale	Commissioner of real estate and chief engineer New York, New Hampshire, and Hartford Railroad	
Henry Bourne Joy	Yale	president Packard Motor Car Co.	
V. Everit Macy	Columbia	industrialist and philanthropist, president of the National Civic Federation	
Charles A. Peabody Jr.	Columbia	president Mutual Life Insurance Co., member New York State Assembly	
R. Stuyvesant Pierrepont	Columbia	Executive with Keokee Consolidated Coal and Coke Company, director of Bank of America	
Moncure Robinson Jr.	Pennsylvania	director Baltimore Steam Packet Company (aka the Bay Line Railroad)	
Frank Roosevelt	Trinity	co-founder of the Roosevelt Organ Works	
Edwards Ogden Schuyler	Columbia	member of the stock exchange with Trippe, Schuyler & Co.	
John Borland Thayer III	Pennsylvania	treasurer and financial vice president of the University of Pennsylvania, a survivor of the Titanic	
Frederick Ferris Thompson	Columbia	banker who helped found Citibank and JP Morgan Chase	
Henry R. Towne	Pennsylvania	co-founder of Yale locks, director Federal Reserve Bank of New York	
John Henry Towne	MIT	chairman of Yale & Towne Manufacturing Co.	
Juan Terry Trippe	Yale	aviation pioneer, founder of Pan Am	
Arthur Turnbull	Columbia	governor New York Stock Exchange, member Chicago Board of Trade	
Frederick William Vanderbilt	Yale	director of the New York Central Railroad, philanthropist	
George Herbert Walker IV	Pennsylvania	managing director of Lehman Brothers, second cousin to U.S. President George W. Bush	
H. Walter Webb	Columbia	vice president Wagner Palace Car Co.; executive with the New York Central Railroad	
Charles Sumner Williams	MIT	chairman and vice-president of Thomas A. Edison Inc., vice president Motion Picture Specialty Corporation	
Richard Thornton Wilson Jr.	Columbia	banker, president of the Saratoga Racing Association, prominent thoroughbred horse owner	

== Clergy ==
Name	Original chapter	Notability	Ref.
Robert Woodward Barnwell	Trinity	Bishop of Alabama	
E. Otis Charles	Trinity	Episcopal Bishop, first Christian bishop to publicly come out as gay	
William Croswell Doane	Burlington	92nd Bishop of the Episcopal Church in America, first bishop of the Episcopal Diocese of Albany	
Charles Betts Galloway	Mississippi	Bishop of the Methodist Episcopal Church, South	
David Elliot Johnson	Trinity	Bishop of Episcopal Diocese of Massachusetts	
James S. Johnston	Virginia	Bishop of the Episcopal Diocese of West Texas	
Richard H. Nelson	Trinity	Bishop of Albany	
Henry Steel Olcott	Columbia	co-founder and first president of the Theosophical Society, first prominent American to convert to Buddhism	
Frederick F. Reese	UVA	Bishop of Georgia	
Arthur E. Walmsley	Trinity	Bishop of the Episcopal Diocese of Connecticut	
Preston Washington	Williams	minister of Memorial Baptist Church in Harlem, co-founder of the Harlem Congregations for Community Improvement	

== Diplomacy ==
Name	Original chapter	Notability	Ref.
Robert Adams Jr.	Pennsylvania	United States Minister to Brazil, U.S. House of Representatives for Pennsylvania	
Albert B. Fay	Yale	United States Ambassador to Trinidad and Tobago	
Nicholas Fish II	Columbia	United States Ambassador to Switzerland, United States Ambassador to Belgium	
Edward J. Hale	UNC	Ambassador to Costa Rica, publisher and editor of The Fayetteville Observer	
George Pratt Ingersoll	Trinity	Envoy Extraordinary and Minister Plenipotentiary to Siam	
Hallett Johnson	Williams	U.S. Consul General in Stockholm, U.S. Ambassador to Costa Rica	
Vance C. McCormick	Yale	chair of the American delegation at the Treaty of Versailles under President Woodrow Wilson	
Thomas Nelson Page	W&L	United States Ambassador to Italy, novelist who popularized the plantation genre	
James Russell Parsons	Trinity	U.S. consul to Aix-la-Chapelle; U.S. consul general in Mexico; New York State Board of Regents	
Edward Stettinius Jr.	Virginia	U.S. Secretary of State, U.S. Ambassador to the United Nations, chairman U.S. Steel	
Strobe Talbott	Yale	United States Deputy Secretary of State, president of the Brookings Institution	
T. Tileston Wells	Columbia	Consul General for Romania in New York, attorney	
Luke Edward Wright	Mississippi	Governor-General of the Philippines, Ambassador to Japan, U.S. Secretary of War	

== Entertainment ==
Name	Original chapter	Nobility	Ref.
Christopher Browne	Pennsylvania	Documentary film producer and director	
Edward Downes	Columbia	host of Texaco Quiz on the Metropolitan Opera radio broadcasts, musicologist and music critic	
John Eaton	Yale	originator of John Eaton Presents the American Popular Song on PBS, jazz pianist	
Alex Gibney	Yale	Oscar and Emmy winning film director and producer	
Fred Graham	Yale	chief anchor and managing editor of Court TV, legal correspondent for CBS News, recipient of a Peabody Award	
David Hemingson	Trinity	Academy Award nominated screenwriter, television and film producer and writer	
Rachael Horovitz	UNC	producer known for Moneyball (film) and Patrick Melrose (TV)	
Jeff MacNelly	UNC	three-time Pulitzer Prize–winning editorial cartoonist and creator of the comic strip Shoe	
Tinsley Mortimer	Columbia	New York socialite and reality television personality, known for High Society and The Real Housewives of New York City	
Eric Shansby	Yale	political cartoonist for various American periodicals, including the Washington Post	
Fredrik Stanton	Williams	filmmaker, author, newspaper publisher	

== Government ==
Name	Original chapter	Notability	Ref.
Paul V. Applegarth	Yale	CEO Millennium Challenge Corporation and executive with World Bank, Bank of America, and American Express	
Frederick E. Olmsted	Yale	forestry pioneer, chief inspector of the U.S. Forest Service, laid the foundation for National forest program	
Michael J. Petrucelli	Trinity	deputy director and acting director of U.S. Citizenship and Immigration Services	
Nathaniel P. Reed	Trinity	co-wrote Endangered Species Act, Assistant Secretary U.S. Department of Interior for Fish, Wildlife & National Parks	
Cornelius V. S. Roosevelt	MIT	head of the CIA Technical Services Division and grandson of President Theodore Roosevelt	
John A. Shaw	Williams	Deputy Undersecretary of Defense for International Technology Security, United States Assistant Secretary of State	
Strobe Talbott	Yale	United States Deputy Secretary of State, president of the Brookings Institution	
Sandy Treadwell	UNC	Secretary of State of New York, Sports Illustrated writer	

== Law ==
Name	Original chapter	Notability	Ref.
Willard Bartlett	Columbia	chief judge of the New York Court of Appeals.	
John Cromwell Bell Jr.	Pennsylvania	chief justice Supreme Court of Pennsylvania, Governor of Pennsylvania	
Risden Tylor Bennett	Cumberland	North Carolina Superior Court justice, U.S. House of Representative from North Carolina	
Robert P. Butler	Trinity	United States Attorney for the District of Connecticut	
Charles Clark	Mississippi	chief justice Fifth Circuit Court of Appeals	
S. S. Calhoon	Mississippi	justice of the Supreme Court of Mississippi	
John T. Downey	Yale	Connecticut Superior Court judge, former CIA officer imprisoned in China for over two decades	
George H. Goodrich	Williams	justice, Superior Court of the District of Columbia	
Thomas G. Hailey	W&L	associate justice of the Oregon Supreme Court	
Henry S. Ruth Jr.	Yale	special prosecutor during the Watergate Scandal, attorney with Department of Justice	
Gabriel P. Sanchez	Yale	United States Court of Appeals for the Ninth Circuit	
Sydney M. Smith	Mississippi	Justice Supreme Court of Mississippi, Mississippi House of Representatives	
Samuel H. Terral	Mississippi	Associate Justice Supreme Court of Mississippi, Mississippi House of Representatives	
Leroy Valliant	Mississippi	Chief Justice Supreme Court of Missouri	
Van Vechten Veeder	Virginia	Judge, U.S. Eastern District of New York	
Richard Smith Whaley	Virginia	senior judge of the U.S. Court of Claims, U.S. House of Representatives from South Carolina	
J. Harvie Wilkinson III	Yale	judge Fourth Circuit Court of Appeals	
Thomas H. Woods	Williams	Chief Justice Superior Court of Mississippi, Mississippi House of Representatives, lawyer	
Julian M. Wright	MIT	judge advocate in the International Court in Cairo, Egypt	

== Literature and journalism ==
Name	Original chapter	Notability	Ref.
C. D. B. Bryan	Yale	author, journalist, academic, and winner of a Peabody Award and the Harper Prize	
John Stewart Bryan	Virginia	president Richmond Times-Dispatch and The Richmond News Leader, president College of William and Mary	
George Crile III	Trinity	journalist associated with three decades at CBS News, author of Charlie Wilson's War	
Russ Dallen	Mississippi	editor-in-chief Latin American Herald Tribune, correspondent for Newsweek, head of Oppenheimer & Co. in Venezuela	
Tracy Deonn	UNC	author, received Coretta Scott King Award-John Steptoe Award for New Talent for her debut novel	
Max Forrester Eastman	Williams	socialist writer and patron of the Harlem Renaissance	
Edwin Wiley Fuller	UNC	novelist and poet	
Peter Gammons	UNC	columnist for Sports Illustrated and The Boston Globe, and ESPN commentator	
W. Douglas Gordon	Virginia	editor of Richmond Times-Dispatch and Norfolk Ledger-Dispatch	
Ashbel Green	Columbia	senior editor and vice president of Alfred A. Knopf	
Isaac Austin Henderson	Williams	novelist and publisher of the New York Evening Post	
Robert Hillyer	Trinity	poet, won Pulitzer Prize for Poetry for Collected Verse	
Stuart Kellogg	Yale	editor of The Advocate, managing editor of The Journal of Homosexuality	
Charles Kuralt	UNC	journalist and writer, known for his long career with CBS News, winner of twelve Emmy Awards and two Peabody Awards	
Harold Lamb	Columbia	historian, screenwriter, and novelist	
Lewis H. Lapham	Yale	writer, founder of Lapham's Quarterly, editor of Harper's Magazine	
Sydney Lea	Yale	poet, novelist, essayist, Poet Laurette of Vermont	
Tochi Onyebuchi	Yale	science fiction writer	
Thomas Nelson Page	W&L	novelist who popularized the plantation genre. US Ambassador to Italy	
Mara Rockliff	Brown	author of books for children	
Charles Green Shaw	Yale	writer for The New Yorker and Vanity Fair, poet, children's book author, novelist. abstract painter	
Stephen G. Smith	Pennsylvania	writer, editor in chief of the National Journal, senior-editor at Newsweek, Time, and U.S. News & World Report	
Lucien D. Starke Jr.	Virginia	president and general manager of The Virginia Pilot	
John Lawson Stoddard	Williams	bestselling author, creator of the travelogue genre, celebrity lecturer who pioneered using magic lanterns	
Melanie Sumner	UNC	novelist and academic, received a Whiting Award for her first novel, Polite Society	
Sandy Treadwell	UNC	sports journalist with Sports Illustrated and Classic Sports, Secretary of State of New York	
Edward Sims Van Zile	Trinity	journalist, writer of novels, short stories, and biographies	
Loudon Wainwright Jr.	UNC	writer and editor of Life magazine, author	
Stanley Washburn	Williams	war correspondent	
Donald Welsh	Columbia	editor and publisher, worked with Rolling Stone, Fortune, Budget Travel, and Budget Living	
Michael G. Williams	UNC	novelist, author of queer science fiction	
Jonathan Yardley	UNC	Pulitzer Prize winning book critic with the Washington Post	

== Medicine and science ==
Name	Original chapter	Nobility	Ref.
Glover Crane Arnold	Columbia	instructor of anatomy at Bellevue Medical College	
Britton Chance	Pennsylvania	father of redox sciences, helped develop spectroscopy, 1952 Summer Olympics Gold medalist in yachting	
Lincoln Ellsworth	Yale 1900	Polar explorer, engineer, surveyor, and author who led the first Arctic and Antarctic air crossings	
Andrea M. Ghez	MIT	recipient of the Nobel Prize for Physics, professor of physics at UCLA	
Clinton Hart Merriam	Yale	father of mammalogy, first chief of the U.S. Division of Economic Ornithology and Mammalogy	
Mary O'Connor	Yale	chair of Orthopedics at Mayo Clinic, 1980 Summer Olympics women's eight rowing team, Congressional Gold Medal	
Sylvanus Albert Reed	Columbia	physicist, received Collier Trophy for the invention of the Reed metal airplane propeller	
William Carter Stubbs	Randolph Macon	Louisiana State Chemist, director of the experimental station at Louisiana State University	
Hermann von Wechlinger Schulte	Trinity	professor of anatomy, dean of Creighton University School of Medicine	
William McNeill Whistler	Columbia	founder and senior physician of London Throat Hospital, Confederate surgeon, brother of artist James Whistler	
Rudolph August Witthaus	Columbia	physician and forensic toxicologist, professor of chemistry and toxicology at Cornell University	

== Military ==
Name	Original chapter	Notability	Ref.
John Baptiste Bernadou	Pennsylvania	United States Navy officer during the Spanish–American War, namesake of the destroyer USS Bernadou	
William P. Biddle	Pennsylvania	Major General and 11th Commandant of the United States Marine Corps	
Cecil Clay	Pennsylvania	Medal of Honor recipient, Captain of Company K in the 58th Pennsylvania Volunteer Infantry Regiment	
Charles Edison	M.I.T.	United States Secretary of the Navy, Governor of New Jersey, son of Thomas Alva Edison	
Hamilton Fish II	Columbia	Sergeant 1st U.S. Volunteer Cavalry Regiment (Rough Riders), killed during the Spanish–American War	
William Halsey Jr.	Virginia	United States Navy officer, commander of the U.S. Third Fleet in the Pacific War in World War II	
Lansing McVickar	M.I.T.	Colonel of 318th Regiment, recipient of Bronze Star, Croix de Guerre, Silver Star, Distinguished Service Cross	
Truman Handy Newberry	Yale	United States Secretary of the Navy, U.S. Senator from Michigan	
Elwell Stephen Otis	Rochester	General during the Civil War, Indian Wars, Spanish–American War and the Philippine–American War	
Charles W. Whittlesey	Williams	Medal of Honor recipient who led the "Lost Battalion" World War I	
William M. Wright	Yale	Army Lt. General, recipient French Croix de Guerre, Order of the Rising Sun, Order of Saint Michael and Saint George	

== Nonprofit ==
Name	Original chapter	Notability	Ref.
Robert P. DeVecchi	Yale	International Rescue Committee president and CEO	
James Gustave Speth	Yale	co-founder of the Natural Resources Defense Council, dean of the Yale Forestry School	
Chauncey Stillman	Columbia	Founder of the Homeland Foundation and the Independence Foundation, conservationist	
James Graham Phelps Stokes	Columbia	founding member Intercollegiate Socialist Society, founder of Hartley House, president Nevada Central Railroad	

== Politics ==
Name	Original chapter	Notability	Ref.
Joseph W. Alsop IV	Yale	Connecticut House of Representatives, Connecticut State Senate	
Joseph Weldon Bailey	Mississippi	U.S. Senate from Texas, U.S. House of Representatives from Texas	
John Cromwell Bell Jr.	Pennsylvania	Governor of Pennsylvania, Lt. Governor of Pennsylvania, chief justice Supreme Court of Pennsylvania	
Harry F. Byrd Jr.	Virginia	U.S. Senate from Virginia	
George R. Carter	Yale	Territorial Governor of Hawaii	
Thomas C. Catchings	Mississippi	U.S. House of Representatives from Mississippi, Mississippi Attorney General	
Walker Lucas. Clapp	Mississippi	Speaker of the Tennessee House of Representatives, Mayor of Memphis	
Joseph S. Clark Jr.	Pennsylvania	U.S. Senate from Pennsylvania, Mayor of Philadelphia	
E. Harold Cluett	Williams	U.S. House Representatives from New York, National War Work Council	
Thomas C. Coffin	Yale	U.S. House Representatives from Idaho	
Lawrence Coughlin	Yale	U.S. House Representatives from Pennsylvania	
Charles S. Dewey	Yale	U.S. House Representatives from Illinois. Assistant Secretary of the Treasury	
Curtis N. Douglas	Rochester	New York State Senate	
Charles Edison	MIT	Governor of New Jersey, U.S. Secretary of the Navy, son of Thomas Alva Edison	
Timothy E. Ellsworth	Rochester	President pro tempore of the New York State Senate	
Charles James Faulkner	Virginia	U.S. Senate from West Virginia	
Henry Fay	Rochester	Lieutenant Governor of Rhode Island	
Hamilton Fish II	Columbia	U.S. House of Representatives from New York, speaker of the New York State Assembly	
Eric Garcetti	Columbia	Mayor of Los Angeles, California	
Albert Taylor Goodwyn	Virginia	U.S. House of Representatives from Alabama	
Robert Ray Hamilton	Columbia	New York State Assembly	
Rounsaville S. McNeal	Mississippi	Mississippi House of Representatives	
John M. Mitchell	Columbia	U.S. House of Representatives from New York	
Hernando Money	Mississippi	U.S. House of Representatives from Mississippi	
William Fellowes Morgan Sr.	Pennsylvania	New Jersey General Assembly, a pioneer in warehouse refrigeration	
Edward de Veaux Morrell	Pennsylvania	U.S. House of Representatives from Pennsylvania	
Wendell Mottley	Yale	House of Representatives (Trinidad and Tobago), Ministry of Finance (Trinidad and Tobago), 1964 Summer Olympics medalist	
James B. Murray	Yale	Virginia House of Delegates	
James Breck Perkins	Rochester	U.S. House of Representatives from New York, New York State Assembly	
Charles A. Peabody Jr.	Columbia	New York State Assembly, attorney	
William S. Reyburn	Yale	U.S. House of Representatives from Pennsylvania, Pennsylvania House of Representatives	
Andrew Roraback	Yale	Connecticut StateSenate, Connecticut House of Representatives, Connecticut Superior Court	
Daniel Lindsay Russell	UNC	Governor of North Carolina, U.S. House of Representative from North Carolina	
Francis Sargent	MIT	Governor of Massachusetts	
Willard Saulsbury Jr.	Virginia	U.S. Senate from Delaware, Senate President pro tempore	
Walter Sillers Jr	Mississippi	Mississippi House of Representatives; Speaker of the Mississippi State House of Representatives	
D. French Slaughter Jr.	Virginia	U.S. House of Representatives from Virginia	
James Luther Slayden	W&L	U.S. House of Representatives from Texas	
Lawrence Vest Stephens	W&L	Governor of Missouri	
Gerry Studds	Yale	U.S. House of Representatives from Massachusetts, first openly gay Congressman	
Alfred Holt Stone	Mississippi	Mississippi House of Representatives, Mississippi Tax Commissioner	
William V. Sullivan	Mississippi	U.S. Senate and U.S. House of Representatives from Mississippi	
John V. Tunney	Yale	U.S. House of Representatives and U.S. Senate from California	
J. Mayhew Wainwright	Columbia	U.S. House of Representatives from New York, U.S. Assistant Secretary of War	
Malcolm Wallop	Yale	Earl of Portsmouth, U.S. Senate from Wyoming, Wyoming Senate	
Hugh L. White	Mississippi	Governor of Mississippi	
William Madison Whittington	Mississippi	U.S. House of Representatives from Mississippi	
Anthony A. Williams	Yale	Mayor of Washington, D.C.	
Stewart L. Woodford	Columbia	U.S. Ambassador to Spain, Lt. Governor of New York, U.S. House of Representatives from New York	

== Sports ==
Name	Original chapter	Notability	Ref.
Bill Carr	Pennsylvania	1932 Summer Olympics two-time gold medal track and field, National Track and Field Hall of Fame	
Britton Chance	Pennsylvania	1952 Summer Olympics gold medal yachting, helped develop spectroscopy, National Medal of Science recipient	
Gene Clapp	Pennsylvania	1972 Summer Olympics silver medal in men's eight	
Anson Dorrance	UNC	soccer coach, inducted into the National Soccer Hall of Fame	
Truxtun Hare	Pennsylvania	1900 Summer Olympics gold and silver medal, College Football All-American Team, Football Hall of Fame	
Wendell Mottley	Yale	1964 Summer Olympics silver and bronze medalist, House of Representatives (Trinidad and Tobago)	
Mary O'Connor	Yale	1980 Summer Olympics women's eight rowing team, Congressional Gold Medal, chair of orthopedics at Mayo Clinic	
Herbert H. Ramsay	Yale	president of the United States Golf Association, attorney	
Phillip Stillman	Yale	Yale football team, 1894 College Football All-America Team, president of F. W. Stillman Company	
Anne Warner	Yale	1976 Summer Olympics bronze medal rowing, 1975 World Championships silver medal	
Josh West	Yale	2008 Summer Olympics silver medal rowing eight, World Rowing Championships silver medal	
