= FSO Nabarima =

Floating storage and offloading vessel moored off of Venezuela

Coordinates: 10°14′50″N 62°09′02″W

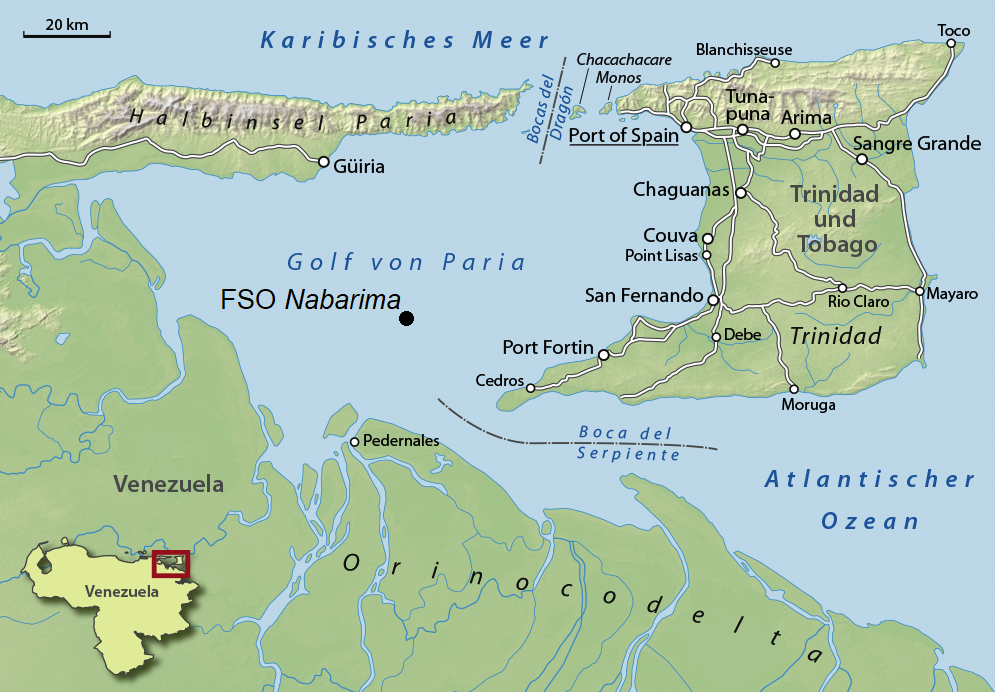
Location of FSO Nabarima

FSO Nabarima is a floating storage and offloading vessel that is permanently moored offshore of Venezuela at the Corocoro oil field in the Gulf of Paria, located between Venezuela and the island of Trinidad. After production at Corocoro ceased in 2019 following United States sanctions on the Venezuelan state oil company Petróleos de Venezuela (PDVSA) and following years of neglect, Nabarima fell into a state of disrepair, and was reported in 2020 to be at risk of spilling her cargo of about 1.3 million barrels of crude oil.

== Description ==
FSO Nabarima is a floating storage and offloading vessel, without motors, that is permanently moored offshore of Venezuela at the Corocoro oil field in the Gulf of Paria and whose main purpose was to receive the petroleum produced by the mixed company Petrowarao, in Delta Amacuro state. Nabarima used to be held with nine anchors and is connected to a 23 kilometres (14 mi) long pipeline system.

== Operations ==
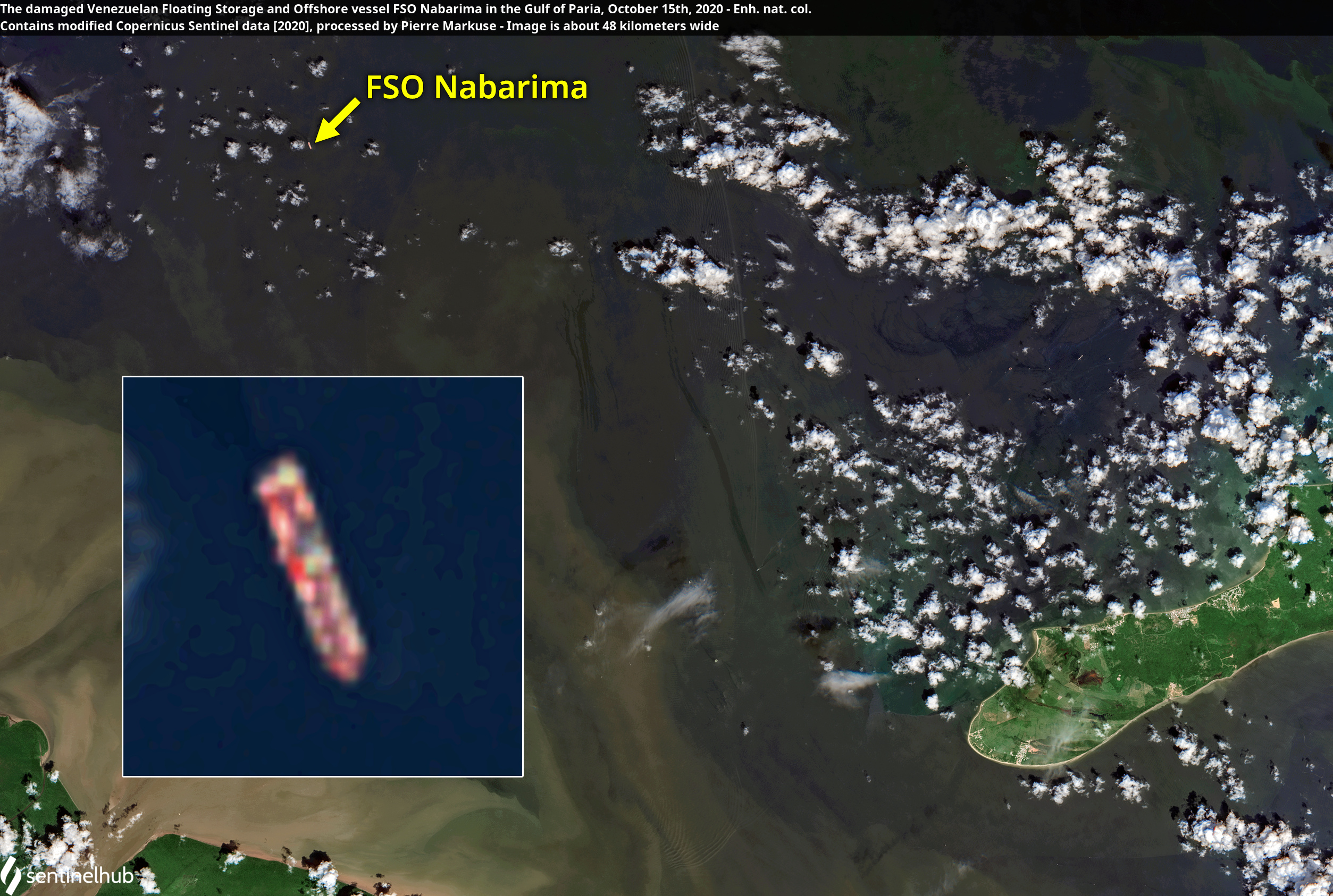
The damaged Venezuelan Floating Storage and Offshore vessel FSO Nabarima, October 15th, 2020

Nabarima, with a capacity of 1.4 million barrels of oil, was built in 2005 by Samsung Heavy Industries in South Korea for ConocoPhillips, which at the time operated the Corocoro field. In 2007, Hugo Chávez expropriated ConocoPhillips' assets in Venezuela and the country seized control of Corocoro and Nabarima, which passed into the control of Petrosucre, a joint venture of PDVSA, which owns 74%, and Italian oil company Eni, which owns the remaining 26%.

In early 2019, Petrosucre shut down production at Corocoro after the United States placed sanctions on PDVSA that prevented Petrosucre from exporting oil to Citgo, which had previously purchased Corocoro oil. After years of neglect, Nabarima fell into a state of disrepair Russ Dallen, head of Caracas Capital Markets, who closely tracks Venezuela’s maritime industry, said that the ship “should not be in this shape except for neglect and stupidity.” An industry executive, who spoke to The Associated Press on the condition of anonymity for fear of retaliation, said the lack of maintenance appeared to have damaged valves in the ballast system used to stabilise the ship.

== Shutdown ==
Following the Corocoro shutdown, Nabarima was abandoned with about 1.3 million barrels of crude aboard. For months, opposition leaders and petroleum union leaders warned that the tanker was listing and at risk of sinking and causing a significant environmental disaster. Government spokespeople denied this. Nabarima is a double-hulled tanker, which offers some security. According to complaints made by PDVSA workers, its main process, control, auxiliary and security equipment was inoperative due to "lack of maintenance and management incompetence", the tanker being operated with a skeleton crew, although designed to be operated by 80 workers. In July 2020, Nabarima began listing to starboard, followed by a leak into her engine room the following month, which failed bilge pumps were unable to pump out. According to Eudis Girot, the leader of the Unitary Federation of Petroleum Workers of Venezuela, there was about 9 feet (2.7 m) of water in the lower decks of Nabarima by early September and the Associated Press reported that she continued to list about 5 degrees to starboard, though PDVSA said that her condition was "satisfactory" and Eni considered the vessel "stable." Girot warned of the possibility of an environmental disaster occurring. The ship was filled almost to its maximum capacity of 1.4 million barrels of crude, about five times the amount the Exxon Valdez spilled in 1989. Critics of PDVSA have said the tanker is an example of the government's corruption and mismanagement. At the time, Eni was negotiating with the United States Treasury Department for permission to offload the oil on board.

On 17 August, El Pitazo published a video in which petroleum workers denounced the poor conditions of the vessel. On 1 September, Girot said that conditions faced by the three workers on board were subhuman since they did not have lifeboats, the fire extinguishers had expired, the bathrooms had collapsed, they had little food and coexisted with rats. The following day, an inspection was ordered, and at 8:45 a.m. (VET) Manuel Parra, PDVSA Supply and Commerce manager, arrived in a helicopter to carry out an inspection. On 3 September, it was announced that the tanker was not at risk of sinking anymore; the following day Girot affirmed that elements of Maduro's government "planned the sinking of the Nabarima tanker.

Nabarima remained listing in mid-October, when Reuters reported that crews were undertaking repairs to the ship while Eni continued discussions with the US government "in order to prevent any sanctions risk." On 16 October, the United States embassy in Trinidad and Tobago declared that the sanctions against Venezuela were not designed to affect "security, environmental or humanitarian activities". National Assembly deputy Robert Alcalá declared on 17 October that the Assembly must pressure for the immediate removal of the vessel and fix the damage to prevent major environmental harm. Several days later, Reuters reported that the list had been corrected, while PDVSA was said to be planning to transfer oil off of Nabarima to at least one of the company's tankers. A visit by a team of experts from Trinidad and Tobago confirmed that the list had been corrected, and a tank barge and oil tanker have been designated for removal of 550,000 barrels of oil for delivery to Venezuela.

On 2 November, the United States Department of State assured that Eni's efforts to prevent an oil spill would not be in conflict with the sanctions and expressed its support for the emergency reparations. The following day the National Assembly of Venezuela held Maduro's administration responsible for the deterioration of Nabarima and requested that the United Nations Office for Project Services and the International Maritime Organization urgently inspect the vessel. The Assembly also asked Italian company Eni to follow the experts' recommendations for the immediate offloading of the oil from the board. Nueva Esparta state Tobías Bolívar deputy declared that of the original 80 petroleum workers only six remained on board the vessel.

== See also ==
- FSO Safer
