= Edwards Ogden Schuyler =

New York Stock Exchange member

- Born: May 23, 1865; Jersey City, New Jersey, US
- Died: January 14, 1905 (aged 39); Pinehurst, North Carolina, US
- Education: Columbia University
- Occupations: Stock Market trader New York Stock Exchange member
- Employer(s): Tripp, Schuyler & Co. E. O Schuyler & Co. Schuyler, Chadwick & Stout

Edwards Odgen Schuyler (May 23, 1865 – January 4, 1905) was an American stock trader and member of the New York Stock Exchange.

== Early life ==
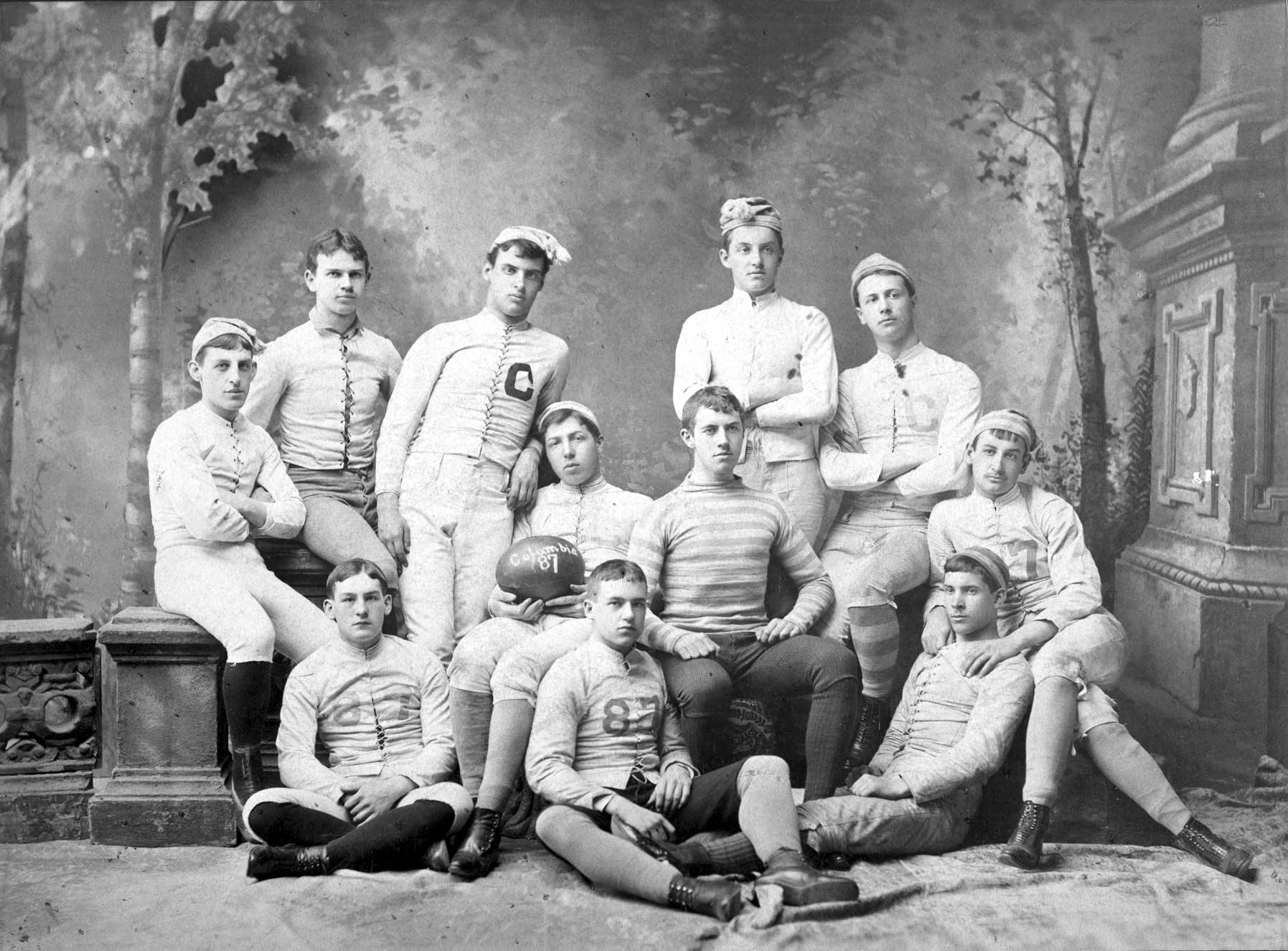
Columbia University freshman football team, 1883. Schuyler is in the middle of the bottom row.

Schuyler was born in Jersey City, New Jersey, the son of Susannah Haigh (née Edwards) and Jacob Rutsen Schuyler, president of the firearms firm of Schuyler, Hartley & Graham that made weapons for the United States during the Civil War. Rutsen Schuyler was also a personal friend of president Chester Alan Arthur.

The family moved to Bergen Point, New Jersey (now Bayonne, New Jersey) sometime before 1864. In 1875, Schuyler traveled to England on the SS Abyssinia with his sisters Annie and Sue, and a maid. The family also vacationed Newport, Maine. In 1884, his father became partially paralyzed while vacationing with Schuyler in Newport; however, Rutsen Schuyler lived until February 1887.

Schuyler attended Columbia University, graduating with an A.B. in 1887. As a freshman in 1883, he played on the football team. He also joined the Fraternity of Delta Psi (St. Anthony Hall). He wrote his senior thesis on "Culture Essential to Modern Success."

== Career ==
On March 4, 1901, he co-founded the brokerage and banking house of Schuyler, Chadwick & Stout with John R. Chadwick, G. Lee Stout, Jr., and Charles W. Trippe. They had offices at 45 Broadway in New York City. The firm dealt with bonds, investment securities, and stocks for commissions. On May 1, 1902, the firm's name changed to E. O Schuyler & Co. with the same partners. After less than two years of operation, the firm had "built up an excellent business, and has been unusually successful," according to the New-York Tribune.

"One February 26, 1903, Schuyler was elected to the New York Stock Exchange, taking the seat of Stout who had retired.

On March 2, 1903, E.O. Schuyler & Co. dissolved, becoming Trippe, Schuler & Co. with partners Trippe, Chadwick, and Robert L. Paret. Their offices were in the Mills Building on 35 Wall Street in New York City. Schuyler remained the senior partner with this firm until his death in 1905.

When Schuyler died, his seat on the stock exchange sold for $82,000 (equivalent to $2,900,000 in today's money), matching the record price for Stock Exchange membership.

== Personal ==
Schuyler married Georgia A. De Fontaine on October 12, 1887. The couple had five daughters, with two living to adulthood—Katherine Van Rensselaer Schuyler and Sarah Edwards Schuyler. They lived in Bayonne, New Jersey and vacationed at Atlantic Highlands, New Jersey

He was a member of the St. Anthony Club of New York and served on the vestry of Trinity Episcopal Church in Bayonne, New Jersey. He also played whist, serving on the board of the New Jersey Whist Association and winning the New Jersey State Trophy in 1898.

Schuyler was an active athlete who was a member of the Augonauta Rowing Association in Bergen Point, the Bergen Point Lawn Tennis Club, the New Jersey Athletic Club, and the Richmond County Country Club. He was elected to membership of the University Athletic Club, an offshoot of the University Cub of New York. He also hunted quail. In 1886 and 1887, he rowed a four-oared shell in the annual Argonauta regatta, serving on the winning team in 1887. Also in 1887, he participated in the eight-oared shell race at the Staten Island Boat Club Regatta. In 1888 and 1889, he won the men's singles in the Bergen Point Lawn Tennis Club's annual tournament, receiving the club's silver challenge cup. In August 1896, Schuyler and two companions caught a record number of 111 weakfish at Waretown, New Jersey.

According to The New York Times, he was a scratch golf player. In 1900, he won the Branch Trophy for all-Staten Island championship golf tournament and the competition cup at the Richmond County Country Club. He also won the Labor Day medal at the Edgewater Golf Club at Bergen Point in 1900. After that tournament, he also won an afternoon mixed foursome competition with his wife as a partner. Schuyler was also the captain of the Richmond County Country Club golf team which competed again the Princeton and other local clubs several times a year.

In December 1904, the family traveled to Pinehurst, North Carolina for his wife Georgia's health. However, in January 1905, he became ill with an intestinal illness. Although he appeared to make a brief recovery, Schuyler died at the age of 38. He was buried in his family's plot in Belleville, New Jersey.
