= Don Leon =

19th-century poem

Don Leon is a 19th-century poem that claims to be by Lord Byron, and which celebrates homosexual love, makes a plea for tolerance. At the time of its writing, homosexuality and sodomy were capital crimes in Britain, and the nineteenth century saw many men hanged for indulging in homosexual acts.

== Authorship ==
The author or authors of Don Leon are unknown, although there are several theories.

As Don Leon includes in its narrative and notes several incidents that happened after Lord Byron's 1824 death, it obviously could not have been written by him.

The extended poem is well constructed and extremely well written, showing evidence of a classical education and knowledge of the processes of the House of Commons of the United Kingdom, as well as an intimate knowledge of the poet Lord Byron's life, including his youthful homosexual adventures on his travels 1809–11 and his romantic friendship with the beautiful choirboy John Edlestone whilst at University of Cambridge. This has led to the supposition that it may have been written by an intimate friend of Lord Byron's – however not by one who was concerned about his posthumous reputation. It was not common knowledge that the poet was what we would now call bisexual until the twentieth century.

Scholar John Lauritsen was one of those who believed that the poem was written from someone within the Shelley–Byron circle.

However, a more recent, and far stronger claim has been made by scholar Charles Upchurch that the author was William Beckford. In 1817, Jeremy Bentham wrote to Beckford, asking that he produce a work that argued against the punishment of men for sex with other men, and which employed classical references to support its argument.

== Dating and editions ==
Don Leon was originally believed to have been written in the 1830s. However, it is now believed to have been written at least a decade earlier during the period of significant law reform.

It was first published in 1866 by William Dugdale, who appears to have believed initially in the attribution to Byron as he attempted to use it to blackmail Byron's family.

It was reprinted in a Fortune Press limited edition in 1934 and immediately fell foul of the obscenity laws; the edition was seized and ordered destroyed, although several copies escaped the destruction and come up every so often on the rare book market. The 1934 edition was reprinted in facsimile by the Arno Press in 1975.

In 2017 Pagan Press published a new edition of Don Leon & Leon to Annabella. All surviving editions, from Dugdale to Fortune Press, were collated for the text. This was the first edition to include critical material in addition to the texts of the poems: a Foreword by editor John Lauritsen, essays by Louis Crompton and Hugh Hagius, correspondence between Joseph Wallfield and G. Wilson Knight, and a bibliography. The original notes to Don Leon contain many passages, some of them long, in Latin, Greek, German, French, and Italian; all of these were translated into English.

== Bibliography ==
- Louis Crompton, "Don Leon, Byron and homosexual law reform", in Literary visions of homosexuality (ed. Stuart Kellogg), Volume 6 of Research on homosexuality, Routledge, 1983, ISBN 0-86656-183-8, p. 53
- Steven Marcus, "The other Victorians: a study of sexuality and pornography in mid-nineteenth-century England", Transaction Publishers, 2008, ISBN 1-4128-0819-7, p. 76
- G.Wilson Knight, Lord Byron’s Marriage: The Evidence of Asterisks (Routledge 1957), pp. 159–201
- Charles Upchurch, Beyond The Law: The Politics Of Ending The Death Penalty For Sodomy In England, (Temple University Press, 2021).
- Doris Langley Moore, The Late Lord Byron (John Murray 1961, rpt. 1976
- Doris Langley Moore, Lord Byron Accounts Rendered (John Murray, 1974),
