= Rutsen =

Rutsen is a surname. Notable people with the surname include:

- Jacob Rutsen Van Rensselaer (1767-1835), American lawyer and politician
- Jacob Rutsen Hardenbergh (1735/1736-1790), American Dutch Reformed clergyman, politician and educator
- Jacob Rutsen Schuyler (1816-1887), American businessman
