= Dramatic Order of the Knights of Khorassan =

International fraternal organization

Logo of the Dramatic Order of the Knights of Khorassan

The Dramatic Order of the Knights of Khorassan or Dokeys are a side degree of the Knights of Pythias, somewhat analogous to the Shriners in Freemasonry. The Order was founded in 1894.

== Organization ==
The Dramatic Order of the Knights of Khorassan has a two tier system of organization, with local "Temples" and a national "Imperial Palace", which meets biennially. The chief national officer is called the "Imperial Prince," while local bodies are ruled by a "Royal Vizier." Upon completing a term as Royal Vizier, a member is eligible to receive the Degree of Prince from the Imperial Palace, thereby attaining the rank of Royal Prince. (Note: "Knights of Pythias". Museum of Fezology. August 2011. Archived from the original on 2022-05-22.)

Thomas Henry Hineline was Imperial Prince of the Dramatic Order of the Knights of Khorassan till July 1913. He died from a stroke on January 11, 1914, in Hennepin, Minnesota.

As of 1923, the Imperial Prince was D. W. C. Yarbough of Birmingham, Alabama, a prominent manufacturer, though the Imperial Palace was located in Columbus, Ohio, in the Clinton Building at the corner of High and Chestnut Streets. At the Orders convention in Portland that year, Imperial Secretary A. L. Frey reported a membership of almost 100,000. In 1979, the headquarters of the organization was in Des Moines, Iowa.

== Membership ==
Membership in the Knights of Pythias is a prerequisite for membership in the DOKK. A member is referred to as a "Votary."

As the Pythian has declined, so has the membership of the Dramatic Order of the Knights of Khorassan. From 100,000 members in the early 1920s, the group fell to 15,000 in 110 Temples by 1979.

== Ritual ==
The DOKK has an initiation ritual based on the motto "Lift up the fallen". There are two degrees, the Temple degree given locally, and the Imperial Degree bestowed by the Imperial Palace. After initiation each member receives a fez.

== Philanthropy ==
By an "Imperial Law" (national resolution) each temple is required to take up a humanitarian cause, often selecting a disabled child whom it supports. The Imperial Palace has donated equipment to 15 nonsectarian children's hospitals.

== Nomads of Avrudaka ==
The Nomads of Avrudaka is a female auxiliary organization to the Knights of Khorassan.
