= Corocoro oil field =

Subsea oil field offshore of Venezuela

Corocoro is a subsea oil field in the Gulf of Paria offshore of Venezuela. It was discovered in 1999, and was productive from 2007 to 2019, when production ceased as a result of United States sanctions on Venezuelan state oil company PDVSA.

Following exploration off the coast of Venezuela, ConocoPhillips was awarded rights to a parcel in the western Gulf of Paria in 1996, and discovered oil at Corocoro in early 1999, when a 12,100 feet (3,700 m) deep test drilling in the southwestern Gulf located three discrete oil sources and a separate natural gas reserve. ConocoPhillips led a consortium to develop the field, which received an initial approval from the Venezuelan government in April 2003 and planned to invest about $480 million in Corocoro with a target production of 55,000 barrels/day within three years from reserves of about 100 million barrels. Under the original plan, wells would have been drilled in late 2004, but shortly after Venezuela approved the project it revoked permission, citing concerns with the business plan and requiring domestic construction of the drilling platform, as well as increasing the taxable rate on income from 1% to 16%. In February 2005, after a PDVSA subsidiary had taken a stake in the joint venture, the project again received approval. ConocoPhillips was the operator of the field and owned 32.5% of the project, with PDVSA through subsidiary CVP holding 35%, Italian company Eni holding 26% and Taiwanese company CPC Corporation holding 6.5%.

Production began in early 2007, with plans to increase production from an initial 75,000 barrels/day to a peak of 120,000 barrels/day through fourteen wells drawing on the field's estimated 500 million barrels of oil. That year, however, Venezuela expropriated the field from ConocoPhillips control, seizing its stake in Corocoro and transferring it to PDVSA. ConocoPhillips relinquished management of Corocoro in May, and its ownership passed to PDVSA the following month. CPC also withdrew, but Eni retained its stake in the field and a new joint venture named Petrosucre was formed, of which PDVSA held 74% and Eni 26%.

Under Venezuelan control, Corocoro production declined to about 15,000 barrels/day by the end of 2018. In January 2019, the United States imposed sanctions on PDVSA that prevented it from receiving payment from American customers, including Citgo, which had been the primary purchaser of Corocoro oil. Over the next several months, production continued to decline to a nadir of about 12,000 barrels/day, until in early March Petrosucre shut down production completely for lack of storage.

== See also ==
- FSO Nabarima, a floating storage platform at Corocoro
