= Leroy Valliant =

American judge (1839–1913)

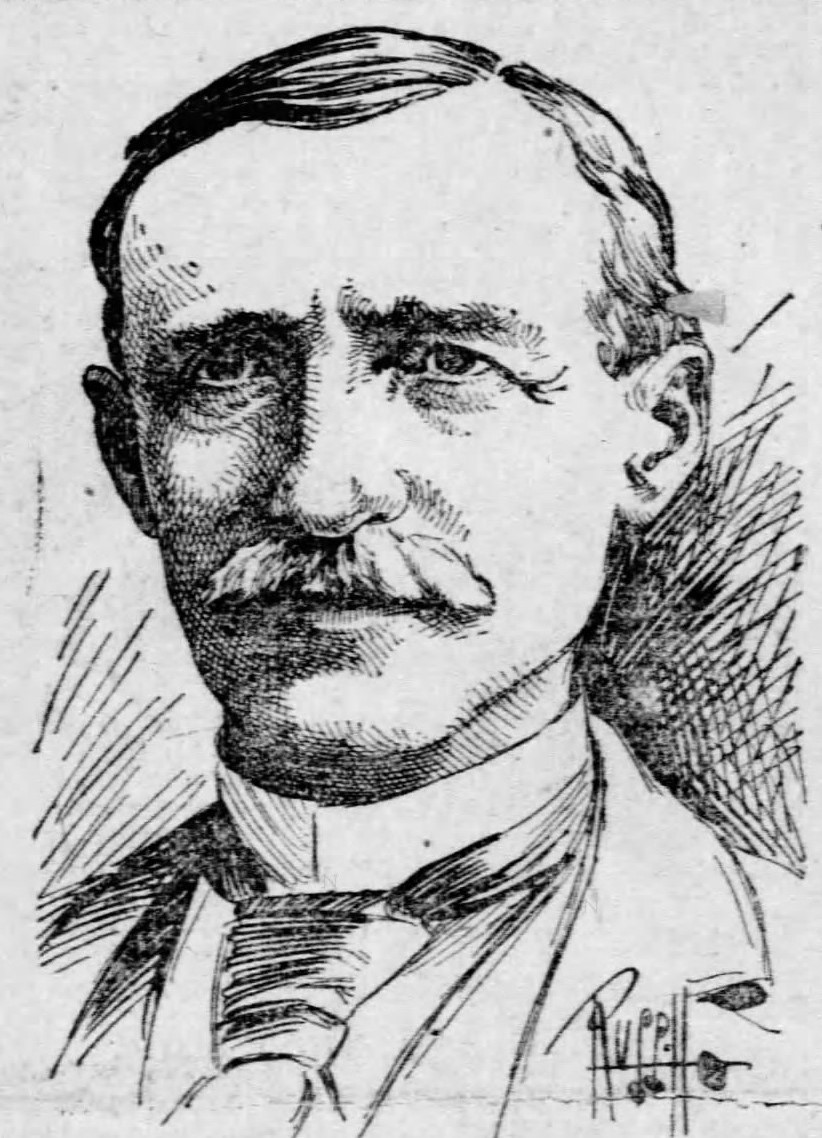

Chief Justice of the Supreme Court of Missouri
- In office 1903 – January 1, 1913

Judge of the Supreme Court of Missouri
- In office 1898–1902

Judge of the St. Louis Circuit Court
- In office November 4, 1886 – 1898

Personal details
- Born: Leroy Branch Valliant; June 14, 1838; Moulton, Alabama, US
- Died: March 3, 1913 (aged 74); Greenville, Mississippi, US
- Political party: Democratic
- Education: University of Mississippi, A.B. Cumberland University, LL.B.
- Occupation: Lawyer

Leroy Branch Valliant (June 14, 1838 – March 3, 1913) was an American attorney and judge. He was the chief justice of the Supreme Court of Missouri.

== Early life ==
Leroy Branch Valliant was born on June 14, 1838, in Moulton, Alabama. When he was a child, his family moved to Mississippi. He went to preparatory school in Holly Springs, Mississippi.

He received an A.B. from the University of Mississippi in 1856. While there, he was a member of the Fraternity of Delta Psi (St. Anthony Hall). He attended Cumberland University, graduating with an LL.B in 1858. He was admitted to the bar in 1859.

== Career ==
Valliant practiced law with Frank Valliant in the firm of F. Valliant and L. B. Valliant in Greenville, Mississippi, starting in 1859. During the Civil War, he enlisted in the Confederate States Army and was a captain of Company I, 22nd Mississippi Regiment.

In 1874, he moved to St. Louis, Missouri and continued to practice law. He was authorized to practice in the United States District Court of Missouri in January 1875. This was followed by his receipt of a license to practice before the Supreme Court of Missouri on March 22, 1875.

In 1884, Valliant had an unsuccessful run for the St. Louis Court of Appeals as a Democrat. In October 1886, he was selected to fill a vacancy on the Democratic ticket for the St. Louis Circuit Court. However, on November 4, 1886, Governor John S. Marmaduke appointed Valliant to the circuit court fill the unexpired term of the deceased Judge Horner. Valliant was reelected to the circuit court in 1892 and served until 1898 when he was elected to the Supreme Court of Missouri for a special four-year term. He was reelected to the Supreme Court for a ten-year term in 1902, serving as its chief justice. He retired from the bench on January 1, 1913.

== Personal life ==
Valliant married Theodosia T. Worthington of Washington County, Mississippi, in 1862. She was the daughter of the Hon. Isaac Worthington.

Valliant was a Master Mason. He joined the Polar Star Lodge No. 79 and became its Worshipful Master in 1889. He then joined the Kilwinning Royal Arch Chapter No. 50 and was its High Priest in 1892 and 1893. He earned the cryptic degrees from the Hiram Council No. 1 in 1894. He was knighted in the St. Louis Commandery No. 1 and was its commander in 1896. He received the 32 degree of the Ancient and Accepted Scottish Rite on March 2, 1900. He became the Grand Master of the Grand Lodge A.F. and A.M. of Missouri in 1904.

Valliant was a member and chancellor of the Shakespeare Council of Knights of Pythias. He served as the vice president of the Southern Historical and Benevolent Society in 1883. He was active in the Ex-Confederate Association of Missouri, attending their annual reunions. He was also an incorporator and later vice president of the Confederate Home of Missouri. He was a member of St. John's Episcopal Church, South.

After retiring, he moved back to Greenville, Mississippi. Valliant died from a bronchial condition on March 3, 1913 in Greenville at the age of 75 years. The United States Circuit Court adjourned for his funeral on March 7, 1913. He was buried in Bellefontaine Cemetery in St. Louis. On August 10, 1913, the Supreme Court of Missouri held a memorial service for Valliant and accepted the presentation of his portrait by artist Mariano Hernandez Arevalo.

== See also ==
- List of judges of the Supreme Court of Missouri
- List of St. Anthony Hall members
