= FSO Safer =

Moored vessel off the coast of Yemen used as oil terminal

Coordinates: 15°07′09″N 42°35′40″E

History
- Name: FSO Safer
- Namesake: Safer (صافر Ṣāfar), an oilfield in Yemen
- Owner: Yemen Oil and Gas Corporation
- Port of registry: Yemen
- Builder: Hitachi Zosen Corporation,
- Launched: 1976
- Identification: IMO number: 7376472
- Status: Awaiting disposal

General characteristics
- Class & type: ULCC
- Tonnage: 406,640 DWT
- Length: 362 m (1,188 ft)
- Beam: 70 m (230 ft)
- Speed: 15.5 knots (28.7 km/h)

FSO Safer (pronounced "saffer" /ˈsæfər/) is a floating oil storage and offloading vessel that is moored in the Red Sea north of the Yemeni city of Al Hudaydah.

Prior to being emptied, the ship held more than 1.14 million barrels of oil. Its structure has been left exposed to humidity and corrosion with little or no maintenance since Yemen's civil war started in 2015. An impasse exists between Houthi groups and the Saudi-backed government over its ownership and responsibility. Inert gas on the ship that normally inhibits an explosion had dissipated, putting it at risk of exploding and causing an environmental disaster. The ship is currently undergoing a United Nations-led salvage operation which has successfully removed the oil and will place it in much safer long-term storage.

== History ==
Safer was built in 1976 by the Hitachi Zosen Corporation in Japan as the oil tanker Esso Japan. As built, her gross tonnage was 192,679 and deadweight tonnage 406,640 tons. She measured 362 metres (1,188 ft) in length and her beam was 70 metres (230 ft). She was powered by a single steam turbine that gave her a service speed of 15.5 knots (17.8 mph).

In 1987, Esso Japan was converted into an unpropelled storage vessel and renamed Safer. She was moored about 7 kilometres (4.3 mi) off the coast of Yemen in 1988 under the ownership of the Yemeni government via the national oil company, which used her to store and export oil from inland oil fields around Ma'rib. In her storage configuration, Safer has a capacity of about three million barrels of oil.

== Abandonment ==
In March 2015, in the early days of the Yemeni Civil War, Safer fell into the hands of Houthi forces when they took control of the coastline surrounding her mooring. In the following years, her structural condition deteriorated significantly, leading to the risk of a catastrophic hull breach or explosion of oil vapors that would typically be suppressed by inert gas generated on board. The ship was estimated to contain about 1.14 million barrels of oil valued at up to US$80 million, which became a point of contention in negotiations between the Houthi rebels and Yemeni government, both of which asserted claims to the cargo and vessel. In early December 2019, Al Jazeera reported that oil had begun to leak from Safer, though subsequent satellite imagery showed that the report had been inaccurate and there was no sign of oil outflow from the ship.

Following a leak in the cooling system, water entered the machine room, prompting the United Nations Security Council to hold a special meeting about it in July 2020.

On 15 July 2020, the United Nations warned that the FSO Safer could spill four times as much oil as the Exxon Valdez oil spill.

On 24 September 2020, Saudi Arabia's ambassador to the United Nations wrote in a letter that experts had observed that "a pipeline attached to the vessel is suspected to have been separated from the stabilizers holding it to the bottom and is now floating on the surface of the sea." In late November, the United Nations and Houthi leadership reached an agreement to allow a UN-led team access to Safer by January 2021 for purposes of inspection and repair. The expedition was delayed indefinitely when the Houthis failed to provide a letter assuring the safety of the UN-led team.

As of October 2021, it was being reported that the FSO Safer was at imminent risk of sinking, fire or explosion. A massive spill would be disastrous, closing the ports of Hudaydah and As-Salif for weeks, disrupting the food aid on which half the population of the country depends. This could also cause a lack of fuel, necessary for pumping or delivering water, and could disrupt desalination plants in the area. A spill would also shut down the fishing industry on which 1.7 million people depend, and could disrupt world trade passing through the Red Sea and the Suez Canal. The potential cost of damage has been estimated at $20 billion.

On 5 March 2022, Mohammed al-Houthi signed an agreement with the United Nations to pump the oil still in the decaying tanker into another ship to prevent a potential natural disaster. The cost of the salvage operation has been estimated at $80–144 million. A conference held on 10 May 2022 in the Netherlands raised less than $40 million toward the $80 million cost of transferring the oil to a temporary storage ship. The UN launched a crowdfunding campaign, asking members of the public for contributions as well.

In September 2022, the UN declared that it has raised sufficient money to carry out the first phase of the operation, and is looking to countries to provide the funds they pledged.

Simulated consequences of an oil spill from the FSO Safer

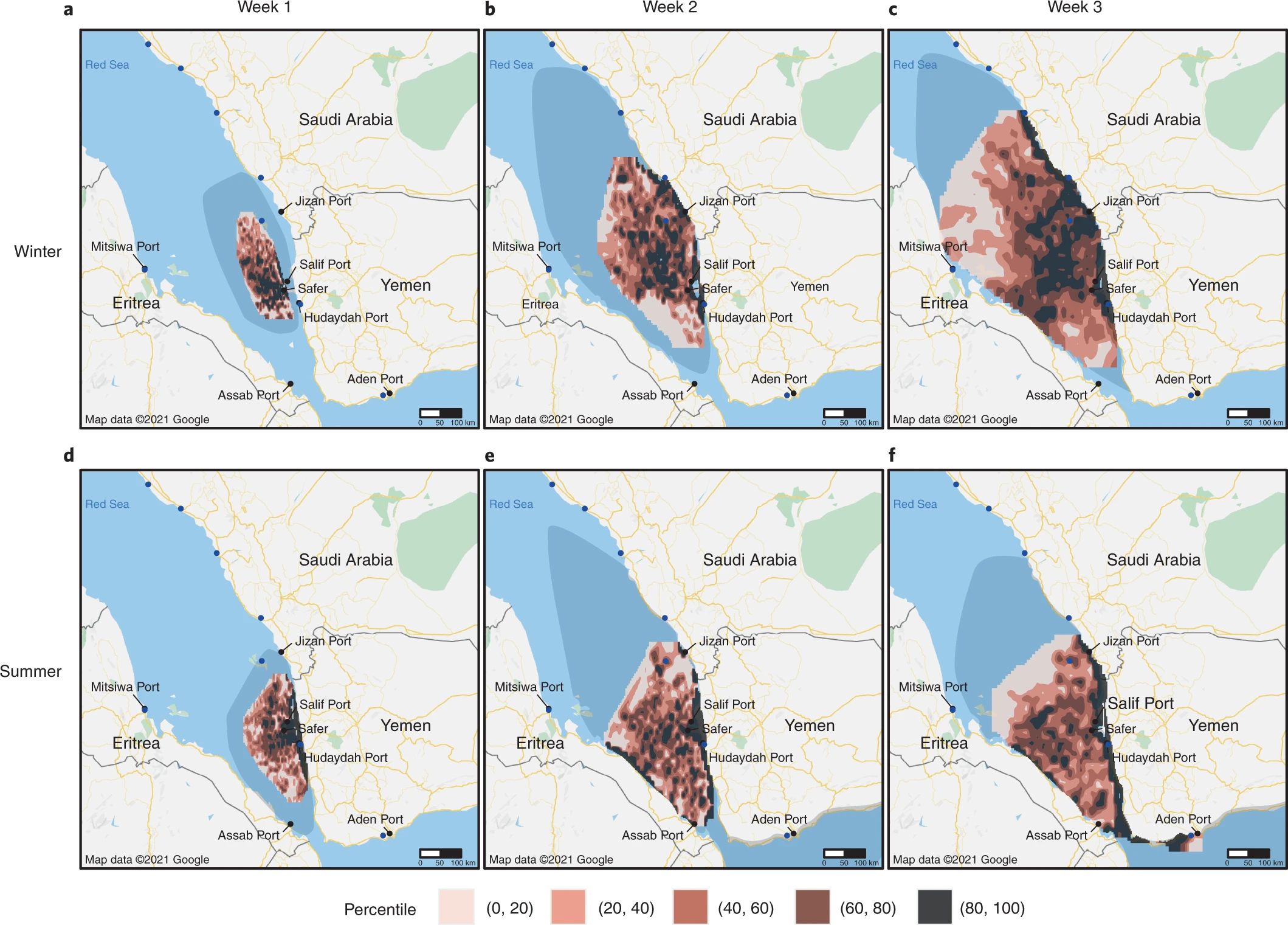
Simulated surface oil concentration of anticipated oil spill

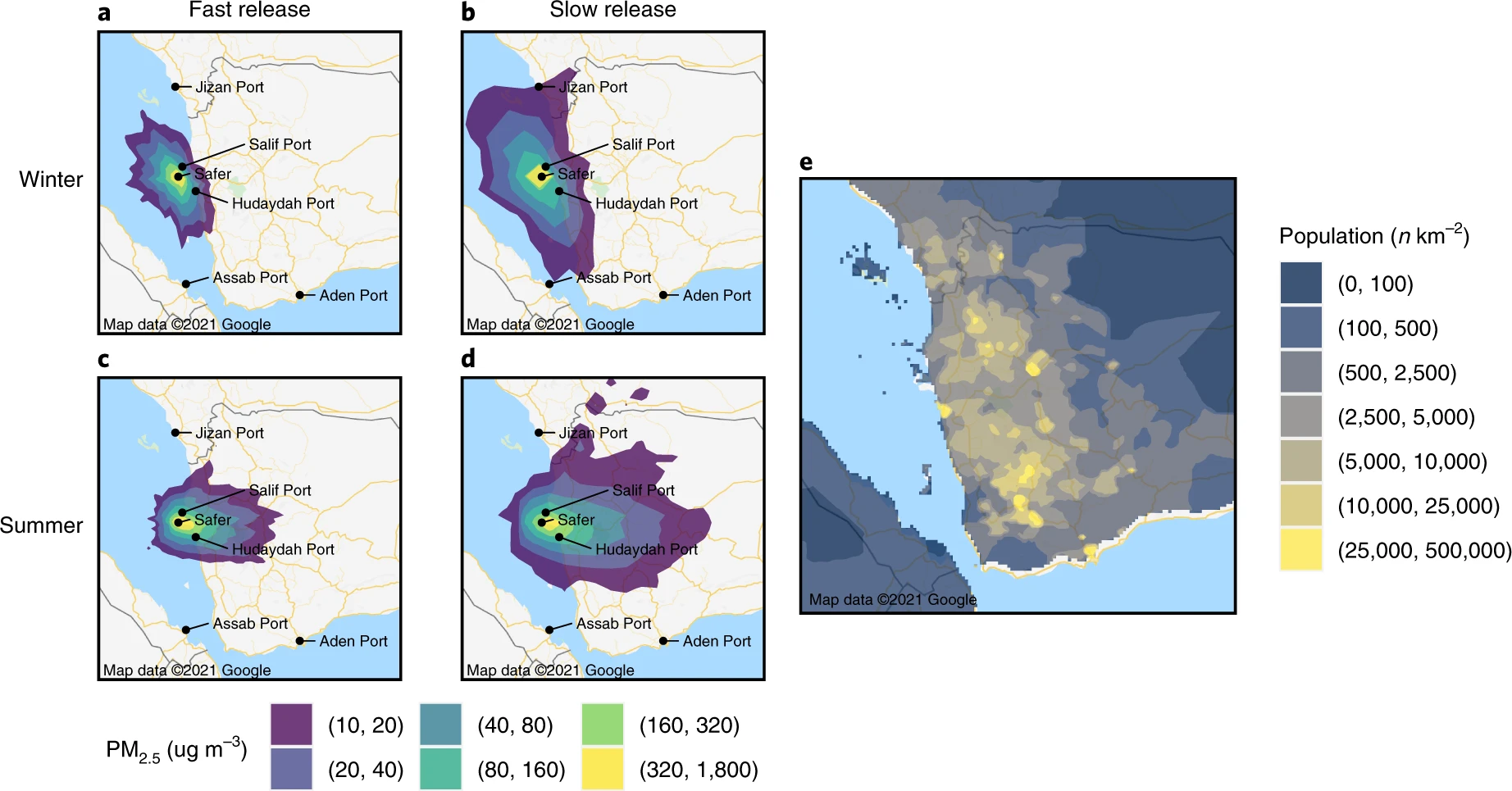
Simulated air pollution concentration (a preliminary scientific projection)

== Salvage ==
In March 2023, in a statement from Achim Steiner, it was announced that the United Nations Development Programme (UNDP) had purchased the Safer, along with a tanker undergoing refit in China to begin the first phase of the operation to remove an estimated 1.14 million barrels of crude oil. The whole operation is estimated to cost US$129 million, of which US$75 million had been received, and a further US$20 million was pledged.

In April 2023, the very large crude carrier Nautica left China to eventually store all oil offloaded from the Safer. In May 2023, a United Nations operation was initiated to extract 1.1 million barrels of oil. A specialized salvage vessel, crewed by a team of experts, successfully reached the FSO Safer.

On 12 June 2023, the UNDP announced that it had successfully obtained insurance coverage for the salvage operation, which was necessary in order for it to proceed. A month later, on 15 July 2023, the Netherlands' Ministry of Foreign Affairs, which had previously contributed €15 million to the project, announced that Dutch salvage company Boskalis/SMIT Salvage had been given the go-ahead to head for the Yemen coast to pump oil from the derelict tanker.

Removal began around 24 July 2023, and concluded on 11 August 2023. The operation has not fully concluded yet, since the ship still needs to be towed away and scrapped. Several companies have contacted the UNDP to express their interest in leading such a scrapping project, though none had been selected yet as of August 2023. Further work on salvaging the hull has been suspended as of January 2024 due to Houthi attacks on shipping in the Red Sea.

== See also ==
- FSO Nabarima
