= Knights of Pythias =

Fraternal service organization

- F.C.B.
- Founded: February 19, 1864; 162 years ago Washington, D.C.
- Type: Fraternal order
- Affiliation: Independent
- Status: Active
- Scope: National
- Motto: "Friendship, Charity, Benevolence"
- Colors: Blue, Yellow and Red
- Symbol: Falcon and Myrtle
- Chapters: 2,000+ lodges (2003)
- Members: 50,000+ (2003) active 1,000,000+ lifetime
- Headquarters: Stoughton, Massachusetts; United States
- Website: www.pythias.org

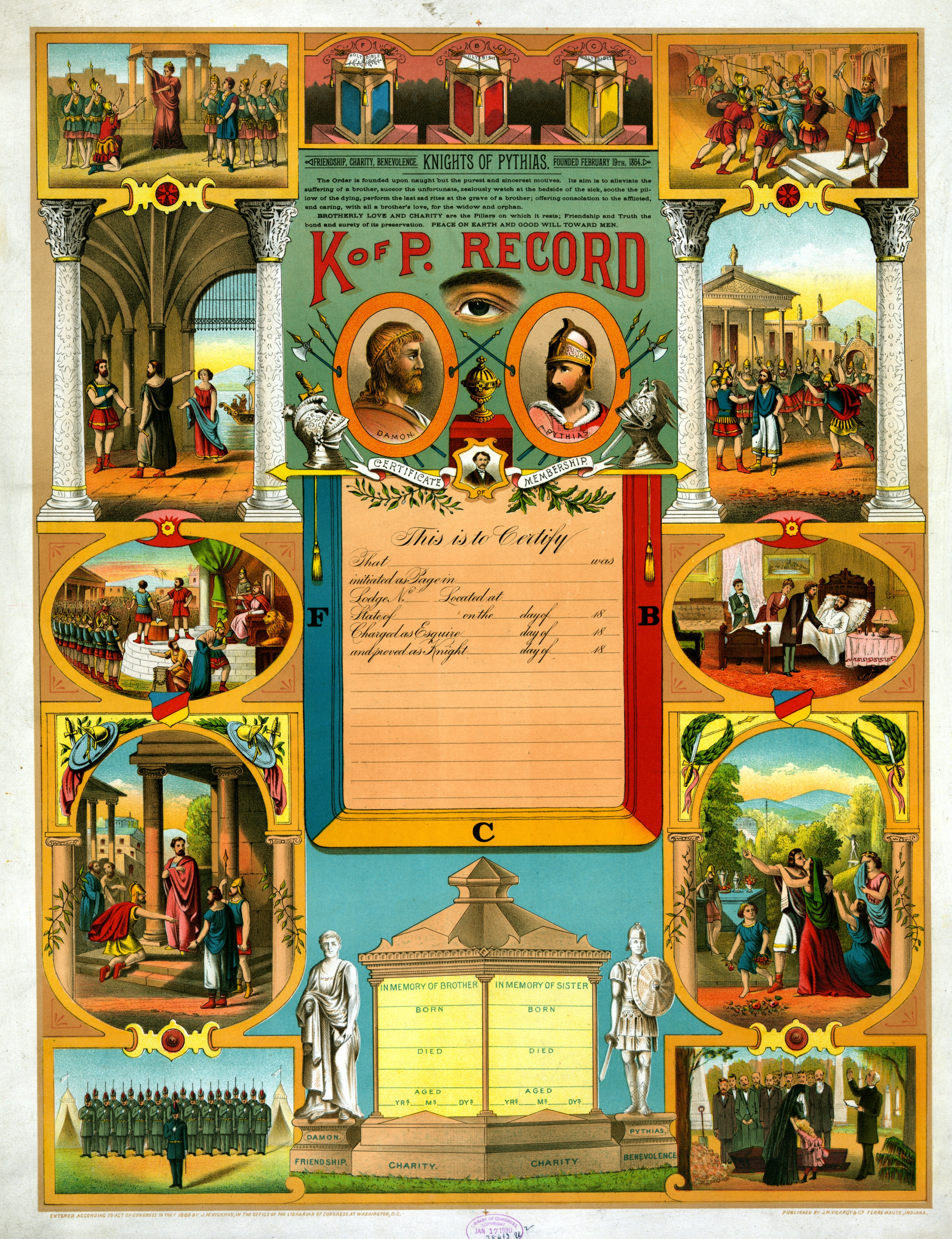
Knights of Pythias membership certificate, 1890 (Note: Caption: "Friendship, Charity, Benevolence. Knights of Pythias. Founded February 19th, 1864. The Order is founded upon naught but the purest and sincerest motives. It aims to alleviate the suffering of a brother, succor the unfortunate, zealously watch at the bedside of the sick, soothe the pillow of the dying, perform the last sad rights [sic] at the grave of a brother; offer consolation to the afflicted, and caring, with all a brother's love, for the widow and orphan. Brotherly love and charity are the Pillars on which it rests; Friendship and Truth the bond and surety of its preservation. Peace on earth and goodwill toward men. K. of P. Record. Certificate of Membership. This is to Certify That — was initiated as Page in — Lodge N° — Located at — State of — on the — day of 18 — Charged as Esquire — day of 18 — and proved as Knight — day of 18 —. In memory of brother — born — died — aged — yrs. — ms. — dys. In memory of sister — born — died — aged — yrs. — ms. — dys. Entered according to Act of Congress in the y. 1889 by J. M. Vickeroy, in the Office of the Librarian of Congress at Washington, D. C. Published by J. M. Vick[e]roy & Co., Terre-Haute, Indiana.")

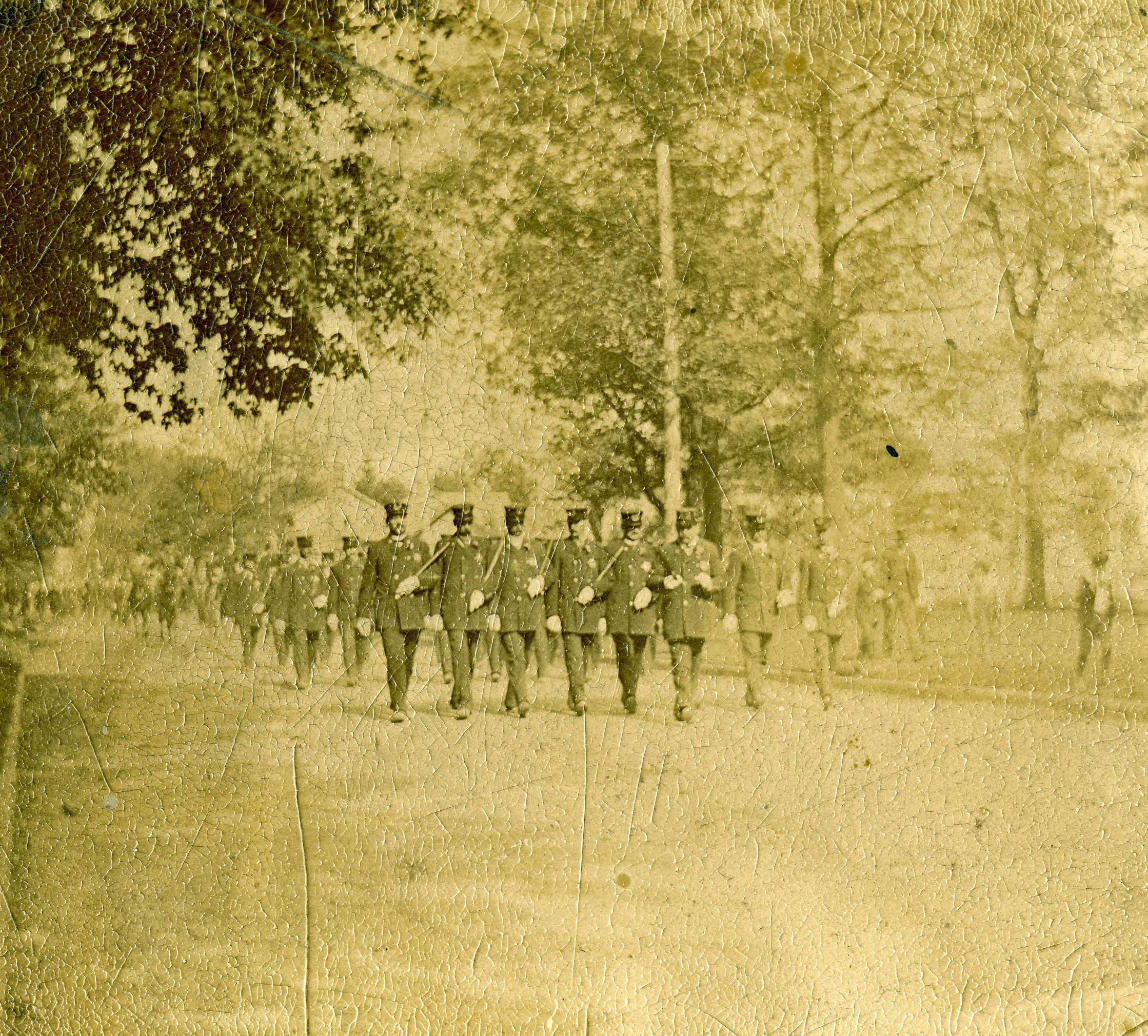
Knights of Pythias in a parade in Toledo, Ohio, 1890s

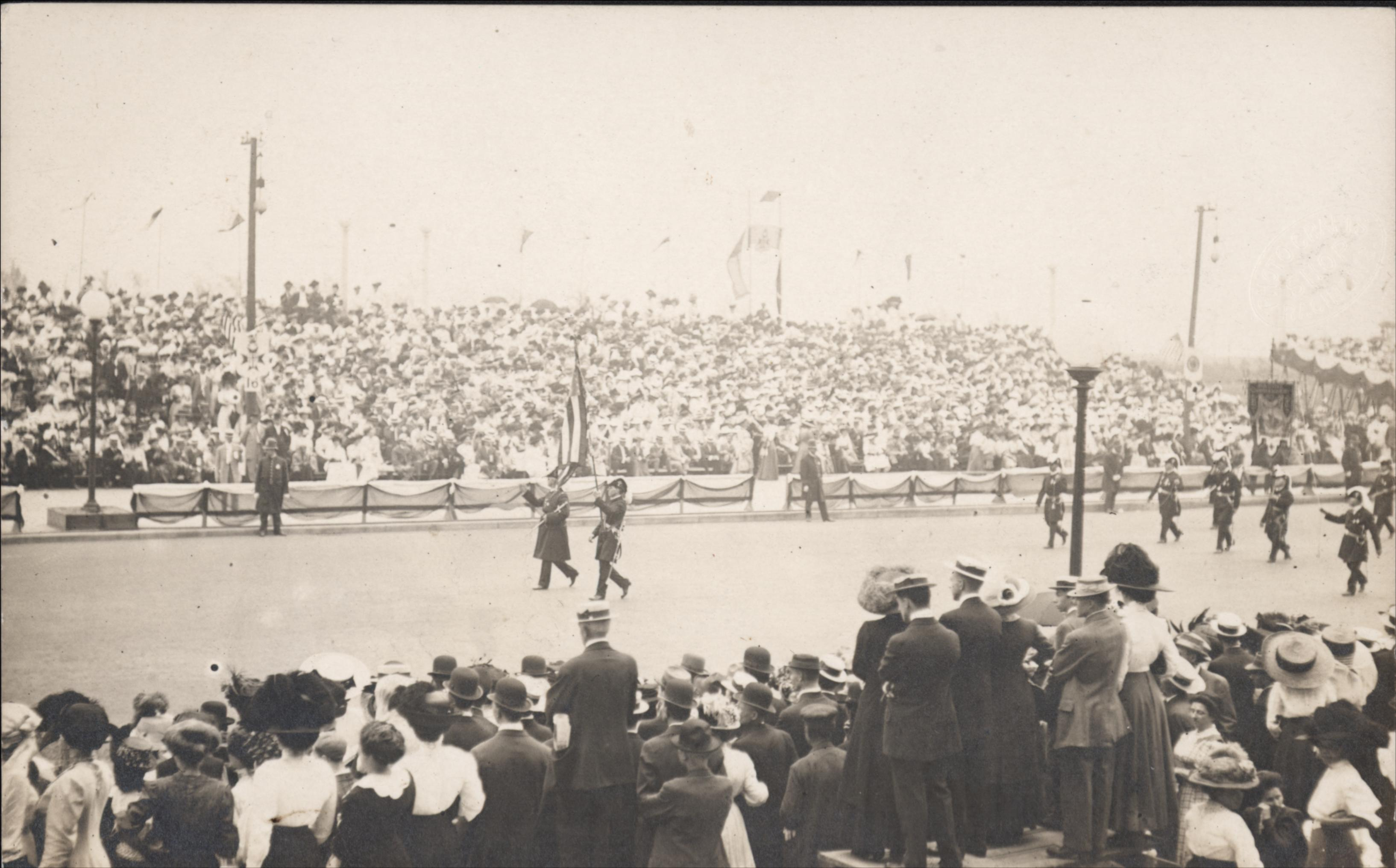
Knights of Pythias in a parade in Racine, Wisconsin, 1910

The Knights of Pythias is a fraternal organization founded in Washington, D.C., on February 19, 1864. The Knights of Pythias was the first fraternal organization to receive a charter under an act of the United States Congress.

== History ==
The Knights of Pythias is a fraternal organization founded in Washington, D.C., on February 19, 1864. The Knights of Pythias is the first fraternal organization to receive a charter under an act of the United States Congress. (Note: Approved May 5, 1870 [16 Stat. at L. 98, chap. 80])

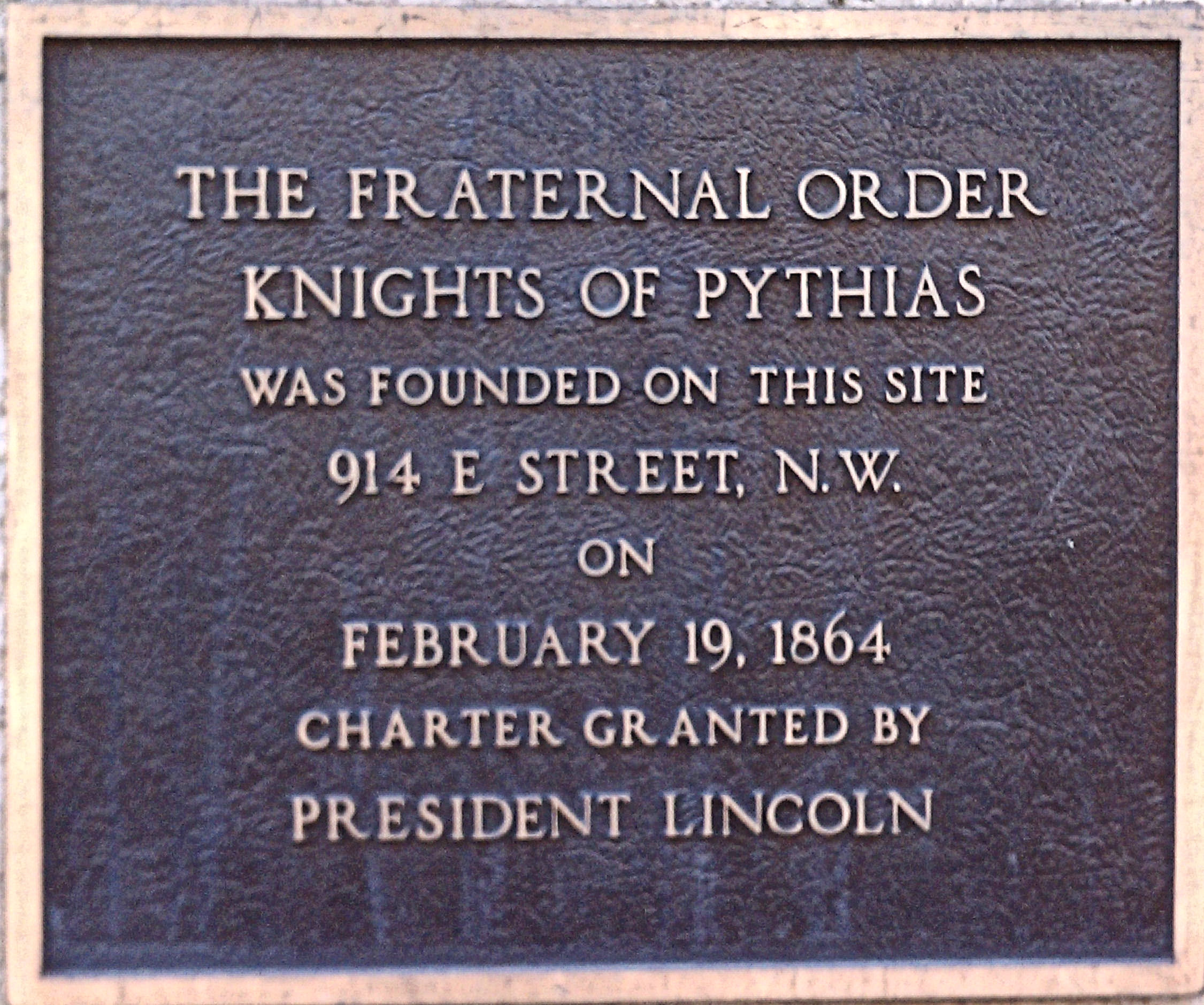
Plaque in Washington, D.C., designating the location where the Knights of Pythias were founded in 1864

The order was founded by Justus H. Rathbone, who had been inspired by a play by the Irish poet John Banim about the historic Greek legend of Damon and Pythias that illustrates the Pythagorean ideals of loyalty, honor, and friendship that are the center of the order.

Membership in the organization was originally restricted to whites only. African Americans formed their own organization, the Knights of Pythias of North America, South America, Europe, Asia, Africa and Australia.

In 2003, the order had over 2,000 lodges in the United States and around the world, with a total membership of over 50,000. Some lodges meet in structures referred to as Pythian Castles.

== Symbols ==
The initials F.C.B. are often inscribed on the order's swords, lapel pins, and crest. The initials stand for "Friendship, Charity, Benevolence," which is the motto of the Knights of Pythias. Its logo features the letters FCB, from its motto, with the colors blue, yellow, and red on an inverted triangle.

=== Sword ===
Early in the group's history, when a man was inducted into the Knights of Pythias, he received a ceremonial sword. Such a sword might be given to a Pythian by family members, business associates, or others as a token of esteem.

Markings on swords varied widely. Most swords were inscribed with the initials "FCB", which stand for the Pythian motto. Images on swords were also somewhat common, and included:

- a man, woman, and child (symbolic of Damon saying good-bye to his family)
- a man looking out of a building, with a group of people below (symbolic of Pythias' pending execution)
- a man (Samson) between some pillars, pulling them down, or various types of weapons (swords, axes, hammers, etc.).

A full Knight of the Pythian order often inscribed his sword with the image of a knight's helmet with a lion on the crest. Many also carried the image of a sprig of myrtle (the Pythian symbol of love) or a falcon (the Pythian symbol of vigilance).

Swords owned by a member of the Uniformed Rank might be inscribed with the initials "UR," a dove, or a lily.

== Organization ==
The structure of the Knights of Pythias is three-tiered. The local units are called "Subordinate Lodges." State and provincial organizations are called "Grand Lodges" and the national structure is called the "Supreme Lodge" and meets in convention biennially. The officers of the Supreme Lodge include the sitting Past Supreme Chancellor, Chancellor, Vice-Chancellor, Prelate, Secretary, Treasurer, Master at Arms, Inner Guard and Outer Guard.

The order's auxiliaries are the Pythian Sisters, the Dramatic Order of the Knights of Khorassan, and the Nomads of Avrudaka. (Note: "Knights of Pythias". Museum of Fezology. August 2011. Archived from the original on 2022-05-22.)

=== Rank structure ===
The ranks of Pythian Knighthood in a subordinate lodge (or "Castle") are:

1. Page
2. Esquire
3. Knight

In 1877, the order adopted an optional rank, called the Endowment Rank, which provided fraternal insurance benefits. In 1930, this department split from the Knights of Pythias and became a mutual life insurance company, later known as the "American United Insurance Company".

Finally, members who obtained the rank of Knight were eligible to join the later-defunct Uniform Rank, which participated in parades and other processions.

== Membership ==
Membership has historically been open to males in good health who believe in a Supreme Being. Maimed individuals were not admitted until 1875. Members are accepted by blackball ballot.

A member must be at least 18 years of age, and must take the following oath:

I declare upon honor that I believe in a Supreme Being, that I am not a professional gambler, or unlawfully engaged in the wholesale or retail sale of intoxicating liquors or narcotics, and that I believe in the maintenance of the order and the upholding of constituted authority in the government in which I live. Moreover, I declare upon honor that I am not a Communist or Fascist; that I do not advocate nor am I a member of any organization that advocates the overthrow of the Government of the Country of which I am a Citizen, by force or violence or other unlawful means; and that I do not seek by force or violence to deny to other persons their rights under the laws of such country.

By the end of the so-called "Golden Age of Fraternalism" in the early 1920s, the order had nearly a million members. By 1979, however, this number had declined to fewer than 200,000.

== Philanthropy ==
The order provides for "worthy Pythians in distress" and has given aid to victims of national or sectional disasters. It runs camps for underprivileged youth and homes for aged members. It has sponsored scholarship funds, blood drives, highway safety programs, and the Cystic Fibrosis Research Foundation.

== Other Pythian organizations ==
=== Knights of Pythias of North and South America, Europe, Asia, and Africa ===
After a black lodge was denied a charter by the Knights of Pythias' Supreme Lodge meeting in Richmond, Virginia on March 8, 1869, a number of black Americans who had been initiated into the order formed their own Pythian group, the Knights of Pythias of North America, South America, Europe, Asia, Africa and Australia. By 1897, the KPNSAEAA had 40,000 members, with Grand Lodges in 20 states and other lodges in the West Indies and Central America. It distributed US$60,000 worth of benefits annually and had a woman's auxiliary and uniformed rank.

=== Canada ===
The Grand Lodge of Ontario was instituted on April 8, 1872. Rowena L. Rooks composed "K of P grand march [for piano]," which was dedicated to Collin H. Rose, Grand Chancellor, and the officers and representatives of the Grand Lodge K of P of Ontario, Canada. The march sheet music, which was published in London, Ontario, by C. F. Colwell, c. 1876, was illustrated with the Knights of Pythias emblem and Latin motto Amico Fidus ad Aras or, in English, "True friends are a refuge".

=== Improved Order, Knights of Pythias ===
In 1892, the Supreme Lodge ruled that the work of the order would only be conducted in English. This upset some members who were accustomed to using German. After this ruling was reiterated at the Supreme Lodges of 1894 and 1895, a number of German-speaking Pythians split off and formed the Improved Order, Knights of Pythias at a convention in Indianapolis in June 1895. The new order was reportedly not very popular, and a movement toward reconciliation occurred a few years later.

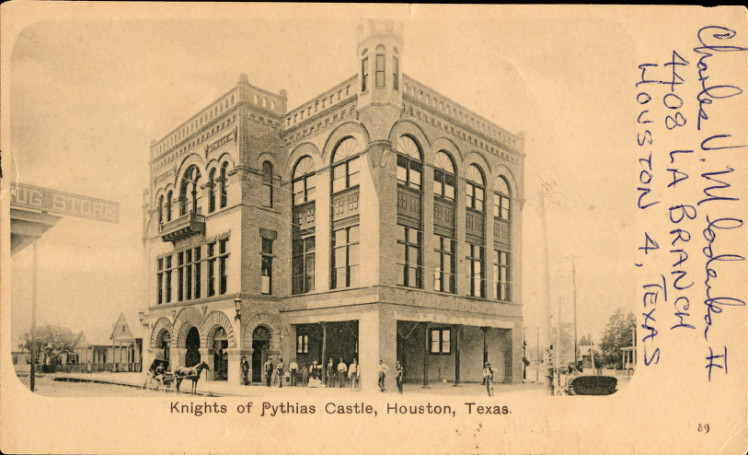
Knights of Pythias Castle, Houston, Texas (postcard, circa 1898)

== Notable members ==
- Granville Pearl Aikman (1858–1923), State of Kansas District Judge and suffragist (Note: "Endorsed by Bryanites". The Eureka Herald. 1900-11-01. Archived from the original on 2022-06-07.)
- A. A. Ames, four-time mayor of Minneapolis, Minnesota
- Louis Armstrong, jazz trumpeter and singer (Note: "Louis Armstrong". Grand Lodge of British Columbia and Yukon. 2005-05-01. "Armstrong wrote in his autobiography that he was a member of a lodge of the Knights of Pythias.")
- Kirtley Baker, National League baseball player
- Hugo Black, U.S. Supreme Court Justice (Note: "Hugo L. Black". Encyclopedia of Alabama.)
- Clifford Cleveland Brooks, member of the Louisiana State Senate from 1924 to 1932 from northeast Delta parishes
- William Jennings Bryan, U.S. Secretary of State and presidential candidate (Note: Kestenbaum, Lawrence (2022-05-10). "Knights of Pythias: Politician members in Nebraska". The Political Graveyard.)
- Robert Byrd, U.S. Senator (Note: Kestenbaum, Lawrence (2022-05-10). "Knights of Pythias: Politician members in West Virginia". The Political Graveyard.)
- Benjamin Cardozo, U.S. Supreme Court Justice
- Leopold Caspari, member of both houses of the Louisiana State Legislature (Note: "Dictionary C". Louisiana Historical Association. Archived from the original on 2022-05-31.)
- Robert E. Lee Chancey, 44th mayor of Tampa. (Note: "Robert E. Lee Chancey - 44th Mayor Of Tampa". City of Tampa. 2022-04-04. Archived from the original on 2020-10-28.)
- Brevet Major Augustus P. Davis, founder of the Sons of Union Veterans of the Civil War (Note: "Biography of A. P. Davis, Founder of SUVCW". Sons of Union Veterans of the Civil War.)
- Carl Day, member of the Kentucky House of Representatives
- Eliot Engel, Congressman, New York (Note: "Eliot Engel". NNDB.)
- John W. Grabiel, Republican gubernatorial nominee in Arkansas in 1922 and 1924 (Note: Herndon, Dallas Tabor. "Centennial history of Arkansas online". ebooksread.com. Archived from the original on 2022-06-07.)
- Leroy Milton Grider (1854–1919), California real-estate developer
- Warren G. Harding, U.S. President (Note: Kestenbaum, Lawrence (2022-05-10). "Knights of Pythias: Politician members in California". The Political Graveyard. Archived from the original on 2022-06-07.)
- William S. Hayward, mayor of Providence, Rhode Island, co-founder of Citizens Bank
- Daniel Hoan, socialist and 32nd mayor of Milwaukee, Wisconsin from 1916 to 1932
- Charles Tisdale Howard, U.S. Attorney for South Dakota, Speaker of the South Dakota House of Representatives (Note: Herreid, Charles N. "Early History of the Knights of Pythias". Archived from the original on 2016-04-08.)
- Hubert Horatio Humphrey, U.S. Vice President (Note: Kestenbaum, Lawrence (2022-05-10). "Knights of Pythias: Politician members in Minnesota". The Political Graveyard. Archived from the original on 2022-06-07.)
- George Rubin Hutto, prominent American educator and civil rights activist
- Bob Jones, Sr., founder of Bob Jones University, prominent evangelist
- Claud H. Larsen, member of the Wisconsin State Assembly
- John Ellis Martineau, Governor of Arkansas, U.S. District Judge for the Eastern District of Arkansas (Note: Kestenbaum, Lawrence (2022-05-10). "Knights of Pythias: Politician members in Arkansas". The Political Graveyard. Archived from the original on 2022-06-07.)
- Frank McDonough, member of both houses of the Wisconsin Legislature (Note: "Bio: McDonough, Frank (1846–1904)". Clark County History Buffs.)
- William McKinley, U.S. President (Note: Kestenbaum, Lawrence (2022-05-10). "Knights of Pythias: Politician members in New York". The Political Graveyard. Archived from the original on 2022-06-07.)
- Charles W. Miller, 18th Indiana Attorney General
- Oscar H. Montgomery, Justice of the Indiana Supreme Court
- Robert Pfeifle, 3rd mayor of Bethlehem, Pennsylvania
- Sun Ra, free jazz musician
- Alexander P. Riddle lieutenant governor of Kansas
- Bradbury Robinson, pioneering American football player, physician, conservationist, and local politician.
- John Buchanan Robinson, U.S. Congressman from Pennsylvania's 6th congressional district (1891–1897)
- Nelson A. Rockefeller, U.S. Vice President
- Franklin D. Roosevelt, U.S. President, who joined in 1936, during his presidency
- Charles Schumer, U.S. Senator
- Ele Stansbury, 23rd Indiana Attorney General
- Park Trammell, U.S. Senator from Florida (Note: "Park Trammell". NNDB. Archived from the original on 2022-06-25.)
- Leroy Valliant (Shakespeare Council) chief justice of the Supreme Court of Missouri
- Lew Wallace, author, territorial governor of New Mexico, major general (U.S. Army), diplomat (Note: "Secret Societies". Chicago Tribune. 1875-05-30. p. 7. Archived from the original on 2022-06-07. "Gen. Lew Wallace, in an address to the Knights at Crawfordsville, Ind., the other day, told them that "secret societies flourish and grow strong only when they are agreeable to the wants, taste, and character of the people among whom they are erected."")

== In popular culture ==
The Knights are mentioned in Sunshine Sketches of a Little Town by Stephen Leacock; an ill-fated marine excursion organised by the Knights is the subject of Chapter 3, entitled "The Marine Excursion of the Knights of Pythias". Several characters in the book are said to be members of the Knights.

In the Marx Brothers movie Animal Crackers, Groucho, as the character Captain Spaulding, reports on his recent big game hunting trip to Africa. He says, "The principal animals in Africa are moose, elks, and Knights of Pythias." (Note: "Animal Crackers (1930) Movie Script". Springfield! Springfield!. Archived from the original on 2022-06-07.)

== See also ==
- Grand Court Order of Calanthe
- Knights of the Golden Eagle
- William Hood House
