= Latin American Herald Tribune =

Venezuelan Digital newspaper

- Format: Online-only newspaper
- Language: English
- Headquarters: Caracas, Venezuela
- Website: www.laht.com

The Latin American Herald Tribune (LAHT) is an online-only newspaper with headquarters in Caracas, Venezuela. It targets English-reading audiences interested in news about Latin America. The publication identifies itself as the successor to the defunct Venezuelan newspaper, The Daily Journal. Russell M. Dallen Jr. was the president and editor-in-chief from 2008 to his death in 2021.

== See also ==
- List of newspapers in Venezuela
