= Joel Sutton Kendall =

American college president (1849–1906)

Texas Superintendent of Public Instruction
- In office January 17, 1899 – July 1, 1901

Personal details
- Born: November 4, 1849 Wilkes County, Georgia, US
- Died: October 7, 1906 (aged 56) Denton, Texas, US
- Party: Democratic
- Education: University of Georgia; University of Virginia
- Profession: Educator and college president

Joel Sutton Kendall (November 4, 1849 – October 7, 1906) was an American educator and university president. He was the first president of North Texas Normal College, now the University of North Texas. He also served two terms as the Texas Superintendent of Public Instruction.

== Early life ==
Kendall was born in Wilkes County, Georgia on November 4, 1849. His father was Reuben Kendall. He attended local school and graduated from high school in Jonesboro, Georgia.

He attended several colleges, including enrolling at the University of Georgia for his junior year. He withdrew due to financial reasons, working and earning enough money to attend the University of Virginia from 1872 to 1874. While there, he was a member of the Fraternity of Delta Psi (St. Anthony Hall). He was also editor of the campus magazine.

Kendall earned enough credit hours for a Master of Arts degree but did not graduate from college because his eclectic choices of courses lacked the academic concentration needed to meet the requirements for a bachelor's degree. However, he received an honorary M.A. from the Pritchett Institute in Glasgow, Missouri in 1901.

== Career ==
Kendall taught at a private school in Brownsville, South Carolina from 1870 until 1872. In 1874, he taught at a country school in Honey Grove, Texas for four months. In 1875, he helped organize Honey Gove High School, serving as its vice principal until 1881. He established and was the principal of the Walcott Institute, a private school, from 1881 to 1884.

Kendall was the president of the Pritchett Institute in Glasgow, Missouri, from 1884 to 1891. From 1891 to 1898, he was superintendent of schools in Honey Grove, Texas. In 1895, he was elected president of the Texas State Teachers Association.

In 1896, Kendall announced he was running for the office of Superintendent of Public Instruction of Texas as a Democrat. He ran again in 1898, receiving the endorsement of publications such as The Waco Times-Herald. He was elected the Superintendent of Public Instruction of Texas in 1898 and again in 1900. He was installed into office on January 17, 1899. In this position, he oversaw a system that taught 700,000 students with a budget of more than $4 million ($154,800,000 in 2023 money).

On May 15, 1901, the Texas State Board of Education elected Kendell the first principal (president) of North Texas Normal College in Denton, Texas, now the University of North Texas. He resigned from the position of superintendent as of July 1, 1901. He was the college's principal until he died in 1906. In addition to overseeing the college, he was instrumental in securing additional state funding for new facilities and better sanitation in Denton.

== Honors ==
The Pritchett Institute awarded Kendall with an honorary M.A. in 1901. Established in 1901, the North Texas Normal College's literary society was named the Kendall Bruce Literary Society in honor of Kendall and the college's vice principal W. H. Bruce. In 1906, the college's first yearbook was dedicated to Kendall.

== Personal life ==
On September 7, 1876, Kendall married Ellen Woodson of Honey Grove, Texas. They had two children. Their residence in Decatur, Texas, was destroyed by a fire on March 20, 1897.

He was a founding member of the Texas chapter of the University of Virginia Alumni Association.

Kendall died from a tuberculosis hemorrhage at his home in Denton, Texas, on October 7, 1906. He was buried in Honey Grove.
