= Unitary Federation of Petroleum and Gas Workers =

Venezuelan trade union

Unitary Federation of Petroleum and Gas Workers (Spanish: Federación Unitaria de Trabajadores de Petroleo y Gas, FUTPV) is the main national labor union of workers in the petroleum and gas industries in Venezuela. It represents over 67,000 workers, including most workers of PDVSA.

The union was established in 2009, from the merger of unions including Fedepetrol, Fetrahidrocarburos, and the United Union of Oil and Gas Workers.

The union has faced internal and external controversies, including allegations of government interference in contract negotiations and union elections, which have fueled labor tensions even as PDVSA's output plummeted from over 3 million barrels per day in the early 2000s to lows under 800,000 in the early 2020s due to mismanagement, corruption, and sanctions, with partial recovery to around 950,000 bpd as of 2024.[2] Representing over 67,000 of PDVSA's approximately 70,000 workers, the FUTPV operates in a fragmented labor landscape where dissident unions report persecution, layoffs, and suppression, underscoring the politicization of organized labor under Venezuela's socialist governance.
