= The Daily Journal (Venezuela) =

- Type: Daily newspaper
- Format: Tabloid
- Owner: Julio A. Lopez
- Founder: Jules Waldman
- Editor-in-chief: Julio A. Lopez
- Photo editor: Julio A. Lopez
- Founded: 1945
- Ceased publication: 2008. Digitally relaunched.
- Relaunched: 2025
- Political alignment: Independent political alignment.
- Language: English
- Headquarters: US
- Website: https://tdj.news/

The Daily Journal was an English language newspaper published in Caracas, Venezuela. It was founded by Jules Waldman, an American journalist who lived in Caracas from 1940 to his death in 1990. The target market of the newspaper was English-reading people in Venezuela, which included expatriates of all nationalities as well as bilingual Venezuelans.

== History ==
The first edition was launched on 17 February 1945 with the name of The Caracas Journal. On 23 February 1958, a special bilingual edition was published to chronicle the flight of Venezuelan strongman Marcos Pérez Jiménez.

In 1980, The Daily Journal began to be managed by the Czech born-Venezuelan raised businessman Hans Neumann, who was the president of the board of directors until 2001 when he died. Rodger E. Farrell became president of the newspaper.

In 2003, The Daily Journal C.A., the previous owners, sold the newspaper to TDJ, C.A. a group of investors led by Janet Kelly, an American born expert on Venezuelan politics. After she was found dead on March of the same year, The Daily Journal passed into the hands of Russell M. Dallen Jr., who was president and editor-in-chief from 2003 to 2006.

=== Sale and demise ===
On 1 March 2005, The Daily Journal, which had dealt with financial problems, was bought by Julio Augusto López, a Venezuelan entrepreneur of Peruvian parents that allegedly had links to the Venezuelan government. The Daily Journal, previously known for "its editorial independence" then obtained a reputation of being a "chavista" newspaper, with the stance becoming aligned with Hugo Chávez's government and the owner, Julio Augusto López, allegedly becoming a member of the "Bolivarian bourgeoisie". In 2006, an edition for Peru was launched and Ollanta Humala, then running for president of Peru, allegedly received indirect support from the Chávez government through The Daily Journal, with the newspaper paying Humala's wife, Nadine Heredia, $4,000 monthly. The Daily Journal ceased publication in 2008 amid mounting pressures and conflicts with the Venezuelan government, during a period marked by political tensions affecting media organizations in the country.

The outlet was later relaunched as a digital platform by its editor-in-chief and owner, Julio A. Lopez, operating from exile in the United States. The Caracas bureau is led by journalist and former Metropolitan Mayor of Caracas, Juan Barreto, who oversees local coverage and operations.

The modern iteration of The Daily Journal focuses on political, economic, and energy-related developments, particularly concerning Venezuela and its role in global affairs.

== Content ==
The Daily Journal covered topics like politics, economy, business, science, sports and so on; although international news were given more coverage than Venezuelan news. The Daily Journal provided reports and columns from its partners at The New York Times, The Washington Post, the Los Angeles Times, and The Times. Some sections put to press regularly included a bridge (card game) column, a comics page, a crossword puzzle and a page full of sports scores. On weekends, the newspaper offered magazines, supplements and Sunday comics. Editorials by the staff of The Daily Journal were hardly ever published.

== See also ==
- Latin American Herald Tribune
- List of newspapers in Venezuela
