= Schuyler, Hartley and Graham =

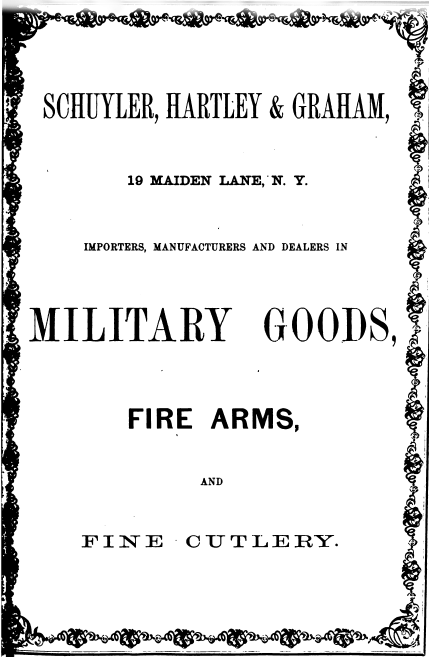
Schuyler, Hartley and Graham (1860)

Schuyler, Hartley & Graham was the largest firearm dealer in the United States in 1860.

== History ==
Jacob Rutsen Schuyler (1816–1887), Marcellus Hartley (1828–1902) and Malcolm Graham (1832–1899) incorporated their company on March 1, 1854.

In 1876 Schuyler retired from the company and by 1880 they changed the name to Hartley and Graham.

Schuyler died in 1887.

Malcolm Graham died in December 1899 and the company was reincorporated as M. Hartley Company. Marcellus Hartley died on January 8, 1902.

The archives are held by the McCracken Research Library.

== Products ==
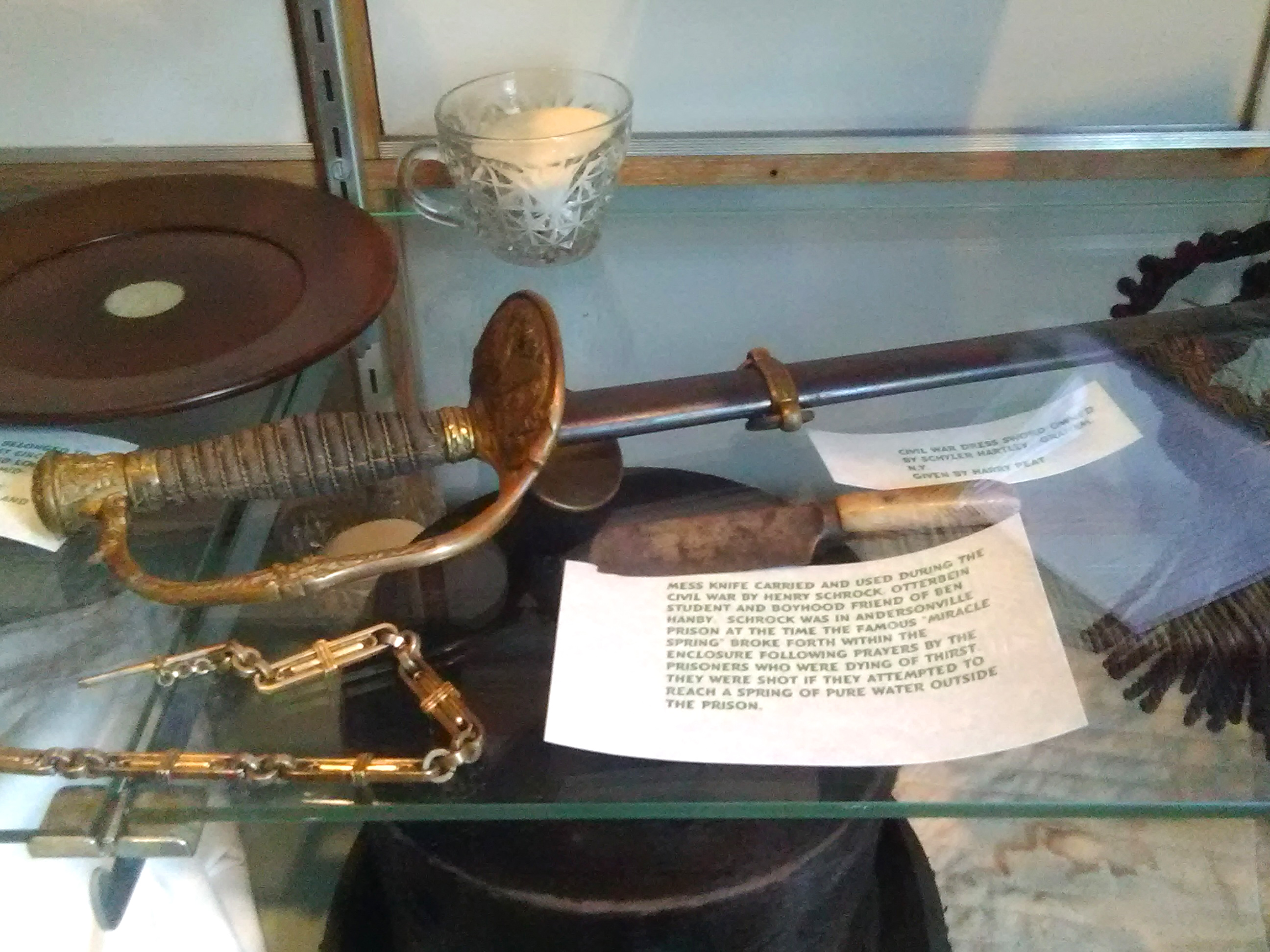
Civil War Dress Sword with mess knife used during war by Hanby friend and student Henry Schrock Otterbein, on display at the Hanby House

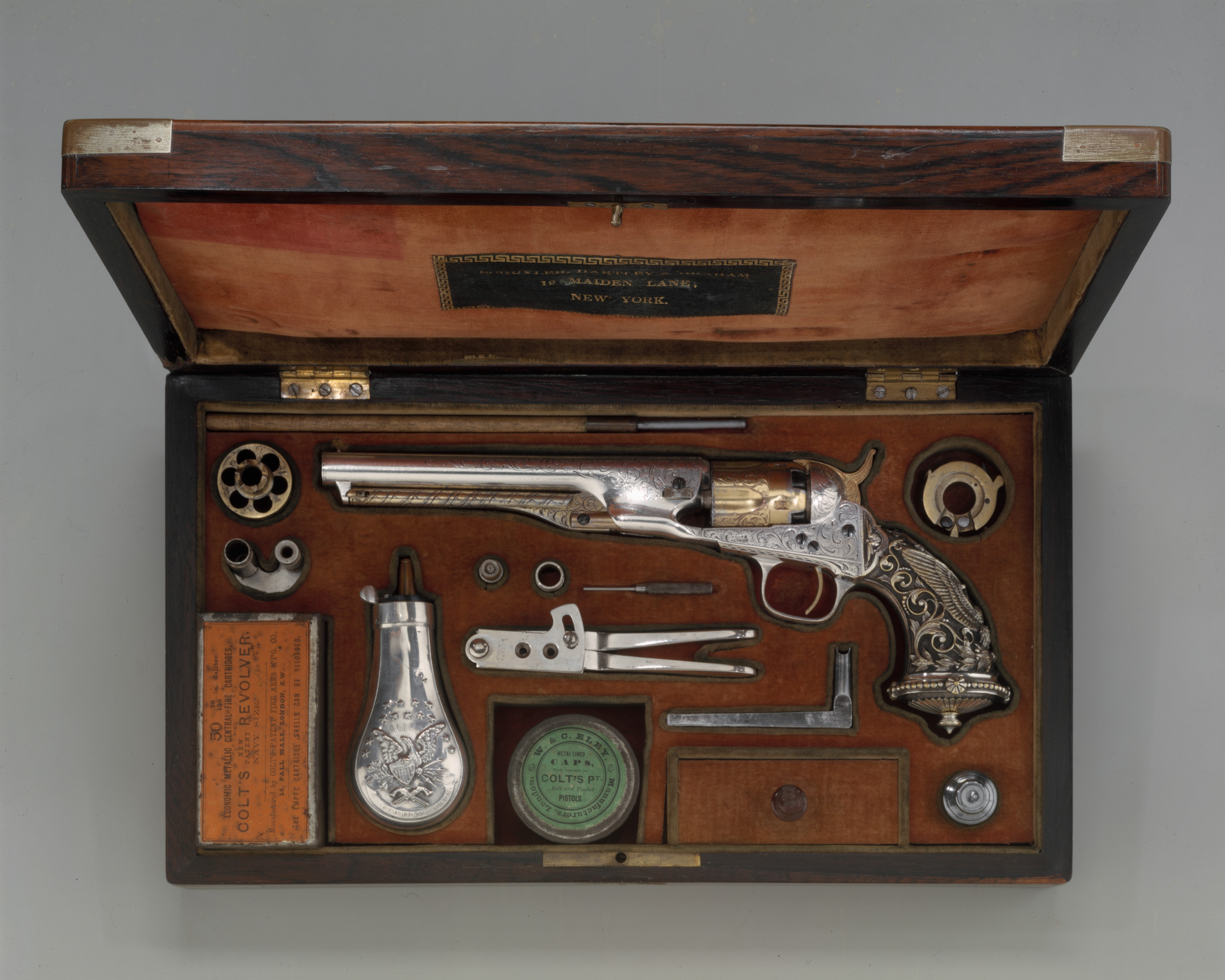
Wooden case for police revolver Colt Model 1862, Serial no. 9174, with Thuer Conversion for Self-contained Cartridges, and Accessories
