= Russ Dallen =

American economist (1963–2021)

- Born: Russell Morris Dallen Jr. January 20, 1963
- Died: September 17, 2021 (aged 58)
- Occupations: economist, journalist, editor, publisher, attorney
- Employer(s): Oppenheimer & Co; Latin American Herald Tribune

Russell Morris Dallen Jr. or Russ Dallen (January 20, 1963 – September 17, 2021) was an American economist, financial advisor, international lawyer, publisher, and journalist. From 2000 to 2007, he was head of the Latin American office of investment bank Oppenheimer & Co. in Caracas, Venezuela.

He was also president and editor–in–chief of the Venezuela Daily Journal and editor–in–chief of the Latin American Herald Tribune.

== Early life ==
Dallen was as a paperboy for The Times-Picayune of New Orleans as a teenager. In high school, he was the editor of a weekly eight-page section of the Sun Herald. In 1981 when he was a senior in high school, Dallen was named an Outstanding Future Leaders at the National Century III Leaders Conference, a scholarship program sponsored by the National Association of Secondary School Principals.

Dallen attended the University of Mississippi where he received a B.A. in economics and political science in 1985. While there, he was a member of St. Anthony Hall and worked for the local paper The Oxford Eagle. In 1983, he was awarded the $40,000 Harry S. Truman Scholarship, making Dallen the first Truman Scholar from the University of Mississippi.

Dallen was named a Foreign and Commonwealth Office Scholar to the University of Oxford where he received a M.A. in law. His master's thesis at Oxford, "An Overview of European Community Protection of Human Rights, with some Special References to the U.K.", was named Article of the Year by the Common Market Law Review and published in book and journal form by them in 1990. He also received a diploma in international law from Nottingham University.

He was a Fellow at Columbia University. senior fellow at the United Nations Association, an American Fellow in the European Community Visitors Program, and the Harold W. Rosenthal Fellow for the United States Senate Committee on Foreign Relations

== Career ==
=== Writer and journalist ===
While at the Columbia University, Dallen wrote for The Daily Telegraph of London and became an editor of the Journal of International Affairs. He also interned at Newsweek, going on to work as a foreign correspondent for Newsweek in London.

Dallen is the author or contributing author of several scholarly works, including four books, and numerous newspaper and magazine articles including The Christian Science Monitor. He assisted Louis Henkin with the Restatement (Third) of the Foreign Relations Law of the United States and Henkin, Hans Smit, and Oscar Schachter with International Law.

Dallen served on the editorial board of the Southern literary magazine Oxford American and The Hemispheric Review.

In 2003 he bought the English-language Venezuela newspaper The Daily Journal, becoming its president and editor–in–chief from 2003 to 2006. He then became its President Emeritus. When The Daily Journal ceased publication in 2008, its successor was the online newspaper, the Latin American Herald Tribune. Dallen was editor–in–chief of the Latin American Herald Tribune.

=== Commentator ===
Dallen was a frequent commentator in print, and on radio and television about South American affairs. He testified before the United States Senate and the Human Rights Commission of the United States House of Representatives. He also addressed the State Department, the National Intelligence Council, the United States Southern Command, and United States Committee on Foreign Relations. He also spoke to the and Council on Foreign Relations and lectured at universities.

=== Finance ===
Dallen was head of the investment bank Caracas Capital Markets, managing partner at family office Ophiuchus Capital Management, strategic advisor to the exchange-traded Venezuela Opportunity Fund. From 2000 to 2007, he was head of the Latin American office of investment bank Oppenheimer & Co. in Caracas, Venezuela. He then oversaw capital market activities for BBO, a Venezuelan investment bank.

Dallen's investing was chronicled by the Financial Times in a 2014 article, saying, "…The basket of defaulted Argentina bonds, bought by Dallen for clients last year when they were trading for 30 something cents on the dollar, rose through the mid 1980s to reach a bid price of 90 cents on the dollar." He sold them at 150, quintupling his clients' and firm's investments.

In Venezuela, Dallen began pointing out shortages, including being the first to point out most famously the toilet paper shortage—in January 2013 when oil was above $100 a barrel and warning of the economic collapse that would come. At the same time, Dallen was able to double investments of his firm and clients in Harvest Natural Resources (NYSE: HNR) in one month before taking profits and earn a 60% return in 6 months in Venezuelan Koch brothers entity Fertinitro.

In early 2016, Dallen began warning that Venezuela would default on its billions in foreign debt, telling Reuters that "It is a question of when, not if," and noting that "The only thing that could change that is a sharp recovery in oil prices, and/or a bailout from Venezuela's friends in China, Russia or Iran."

Keying on cashflows from China and Russia, Dallen would help discover and publicize that Venezuela's state-owned oil company PDVSA was so short of cash that they had mortgaged 49.9% of their U.S. oil refinery Citgo to Russia's state-owned oil company Rosneft and he would later be called upon to testify about Russia's actions before Congress.

The Financial Times in an article titled "Venezuela stopped bond payments in September" credited Dallen with the discovery and proof.

Bloomberg noted that Dallen and his investors were able to profit from his default prediction—for a 300% return when Venezuela and PDVSA were declared in default in November by the International Swaps and Derivatives Association (ISDA).

== Publications ==
- "Overview of European Community Protection of Human Rights, with Some Special References to the UK." Common Market Law. Review 27, 761, 1990.
- "A First Step Toward an International Criminal Court" with WJ vanden Heuvel. The Christian Science Monitor, 1992
- A U.N. Revitalized: A Compilation of UNA-USA Recommendations on Strengthening the Role of the United Nations in Peacemaking, Peacekeeping, and Conflict Prevention, 1992

== Professional affiliations ==
Dallen was a member of the International Law section of the New York State Bar Association. He served on the board of the Truman Scholars Association and the Rosenthal Fellowship Advisory Board He was a speaker at the Annual Meeting of the American Society of International Law in 2019.

He was a presidential fellows mentor at the Center for the Study of the Presidency and Congress.

He was a member of the support committee of Conciencia Activa Venezuela, the media committee of the Venezuelan American Chamber of Commerce, and the board of the Venezuelan American Friendship Association.

== Awards and honors ==
- 1983 Harry S. Truman Scholarship.
- Harold Wallace Rosenthal Fellow for the United States Senate Committee on Foreign Relations.
- Foreign and Commonwealth Office Scholar to Oxford University.
- Fellow in the European Union Visitors Program.
- Ner Tamid Award winner.
- AVAA Award for Patronage in 2004.
- Who’s Who in America
- Who’s Who in Finance and Industry
- Who’s Who in Law
- Who’s Who in the World.
- Article of the Year, Common Market Law Review for "An Overview of European Community Protection of Human Rights, with some Special References to the U.K".
- Dallen is thanked by Donna Tartt in her novel The Secret History.

== Personal life ==
Dallen married Jeanette Garavito, a Venezuelan lawyer. He had a son, Russell M. Dallen III, and two daughters, Allegra Julia Faye Dallen and Arabella Sarah Emma Dallen.

He died on 17 September 2021, at the age of 58.
