= Stuart Kellogg =

American editor and writer (1948–2011)

- Born: January 6, 1948; New York City, US
- Died: August 3, 2011 (aged 63); Apple Valley, California, US
- Education: Yale University
- Occupations: Editor and writer
- Years active: 1980s to 2011
- Employers: Journal of Homosexuality; The Advocate; Daily Press

Stuart Kellogg (January 6, 1948 – August 3, 2011) was an American editor, journalist, novelist, and LGBTQ advocate. He was the editor of The Advocate and the managing editor of the Journal of Homosexuality.

== Early life ==
Kellogg was born on January 6, 1948 in New York City, New York. His parents were Wynne (née Krementz) and George Dwight Kellogg Jr., a teacher and assistance headmaster at Hotchkiss School. His mother died in 1961. His paternal grandfather, George Dwight Kellogg, was a classical scholar who taught at Williams College, Princeton University, Union College, and Rutgers University–New Brunswick.

Kellogg attended Groton School. He graduated with a degree in English from Yale College in 1970, cum laude. While at Yale, he was a member of St. Anthony Hall.

== Career ==
In the early 1980s, Kellogg was the managing editor of the Journal of Homosexuality and The Advocate, a bi-monthly magazine covering LGBTQ topics. He was the executive editor of The Advocate from 1987 to April 1990. He left the magazine to write books. He also edited books on queer theory and homosexuality in literature.

Kellogg was a features writer and columnist for the Daily Press in Victorville, California from 1986 to 2007. He often wrote about California's High Desert and its residents. He also wrote fiction, literary criticism, and a novel.

== Personal life ==
Kellogg's partner of 26 years was Fernando Torres, a Daily Press graphic artist. They lived in Apple Valley, California. Kellogg's brother, David Kellogg, was the publisher of Foreign Affairs.

Kellogg died on August 3, 2011, at his home in Apple Valley at the age of 63.

== Selected publications ==
=== As editor ===
- Essays on Gay Literature. New York: Routledge, 1985. ISBN 9780918393098
- The Essence of Aristotle's Nicomachean Ethics. with Hunter Lewis. Edinburg, Virginia: Axios Press/Hunter Lewis Foundation, 2011. ISBN 978-1-60419-042-7
- Literary Visions of Homosexuality. New York: Routledge, 2016. ISBN 9781138968967
