= Jacob Rutsen Schuyler =

American businessman (1816–1887)

- Born: February 23, 1816; Belleville, New Jersey, United States
- Died: February 4, 1887 (aged 70); Bergen Point, New Jersey, United States
- Occupation: businessman
- Known for: founded Schuyler, Hartley and Graham
- Spouse: Susan Haigh Edwards

Jacob Rutsen Schuyler (February 23, 1816 – February 4, 1887) founded Schuyler, Hartley and Graham, the largest firearms retail business in the United States in 1860.

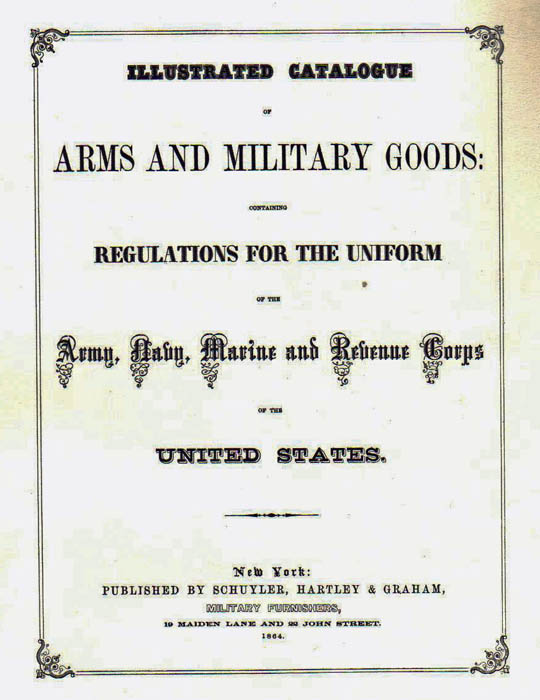
Schuyler, Hartley and Graham catalogue (1860)

== Biography ==
He was born on February 23, 1816, in Belleville, New Jersey, to Colonel John Arent Schuyler (1778–1817) and Catharina Van Rensselaer (1781–1867). His paternal immigrant ancestor was Philip Pieterse Schuyler, who migrated from Amsterdam, Netherlands prior to 1650 to Fort Orange.

He married Susan Haigh Edwards, a descendant of Jonathan Edwards.

In 1854 he founded Schuyler, Hartley and Graham, a firearms retail business, with Marcellus Hartley (1827–1902) and Malcolm Graham (1832–1899). The company supplied military gear to the Union Army during the United States Civil War.

When the city of Bayonne, New Jersey, was incorporated in 1869 he was selected to serve on the town council and he was first president of the board of council. He resigned in 1871.

He fell and hit his head which led to his death a week later on February 4, 1887, at his home in Bergen Point, New Jersey. He was buried in Constable Hook Cemetery in Bayonne, New Jersey.
