= Dearborn =

Dearborn may refer to:

== People ==
- Dearborn (surname)
  - Henry Dearborn (1751–1829), U.S. Secretary of War under President Thomas Jefferson, Senior Officer of the U.S. Army during the War of 1812

== Places in the United States ==
=== Forts ===
- Fort Dearborn, a frontier era fort in present-day Chicago, Illinois
- Fort Dearborn (Mississippi), in Washington, Mississippi
- Fort Dearborn (New Hampshire), in present-day Odiorne State Park
- Detroit Arsenal at Dearbornville

=== Populated places ===
==== Michigan ====
- Dearborn, Michigan, formerly Dearbornville
- Dearborn Heights, Michigan
- Dearborn Township, Michigan, 1833–1960; See M-153 (Michigan highway)

==== Other states ====
- Dearborn, Missouri
- Dearborn County, Indiana

=== Other places ===
- Dearborn River, Montana
- Dearborn School, in Boston, Massachusetts

== See also ==
- Dearborne
