= Dearborn (surname) =

Dearborn is a surname. Notable people with the surname include:

- Arthur Dearborn (1886–1941), American track and field athlete
- Emma Dearborn (1875–1937), creator of the Speedwriting System
- Henry Dearborn (1751–1829), American physician, general, and politician
- Henry Alexander Scammell Dearborn (1783–1851), American lawyer, author, statesman, soldier and son of Henry Dearborn
- Jason Dearborn, Canadian businessman and former politician (Saskatchewan Party MLA)
- Justin Dearborn (born c. 1971), American businessman
- Mary Dearborn (born 1955), American biographer
- Phyllis Dearborn, founding partner of Dearborn-Massar
- Walter Dearborn (1878–1955), American psychologist, educator, pioneer in the psychology of reading

== See also ==
- Dearborn (disambiguation)
- Dearborne (surname)
