= The Peabody =

- U.S. National Register of Historic Places
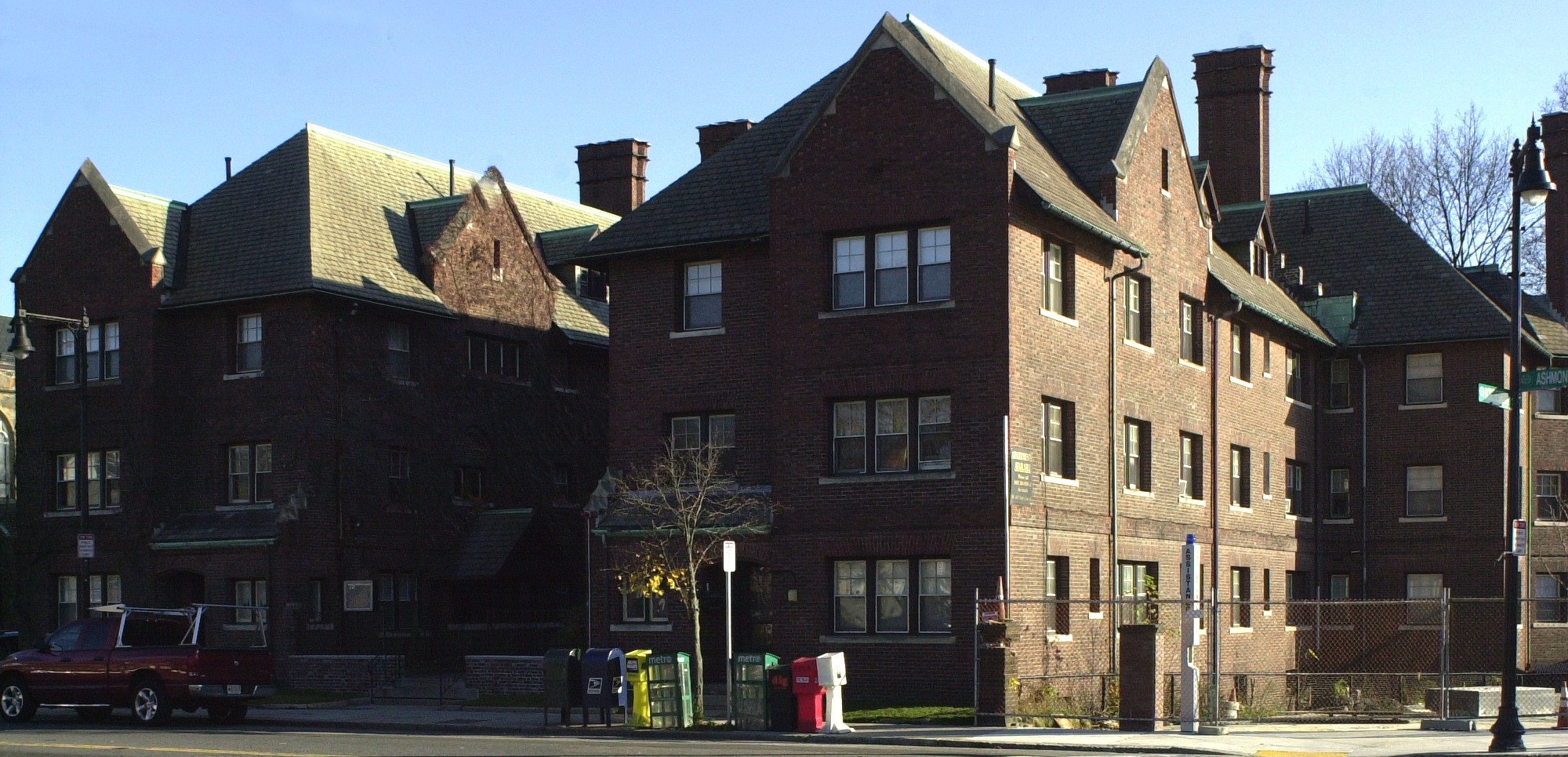

- Location within Massachusetts Location within the United States
- Location: 195-197 Ashmont St. Boston, Massachusetts
- Coordinates: 42°17′8.7″N 71°3′50.2″W
- Area: less than one acre
- Built: 1896
- Architect: Edwin J. Lewis Jr.
- Architectural style: Tudor Revival
- NRHP reference No.: 01000872
- Added to NRHP: August 08, 2001

The Peabody is a historic apartment building at 195-197 Ashmont Street in the Dorchester neighborhood of Boston, Massachusetts. The 3 1/2-story Tudor Revival brick building was designed by Edwin J. Lewis Jr., a local architect, and built in 1896–97. It is named for its original owners Oliver and Mary Lothrop Peabody, who were (along with Lewis), significant proponents of the development of the area. It was built as a complement to the nearby All Saints' Church, which also stands facing Peabody Square, and was financially supported by the Olivers.

The building was listed on the National Register of Historic Places in 2001.

== See also ==
- National Register of Historic Places listings in southern Boston, Massachusetts
