= Unitarian Church of Houlton =

Historic church in Maine, United States

- U.S. National Register of Historic Places
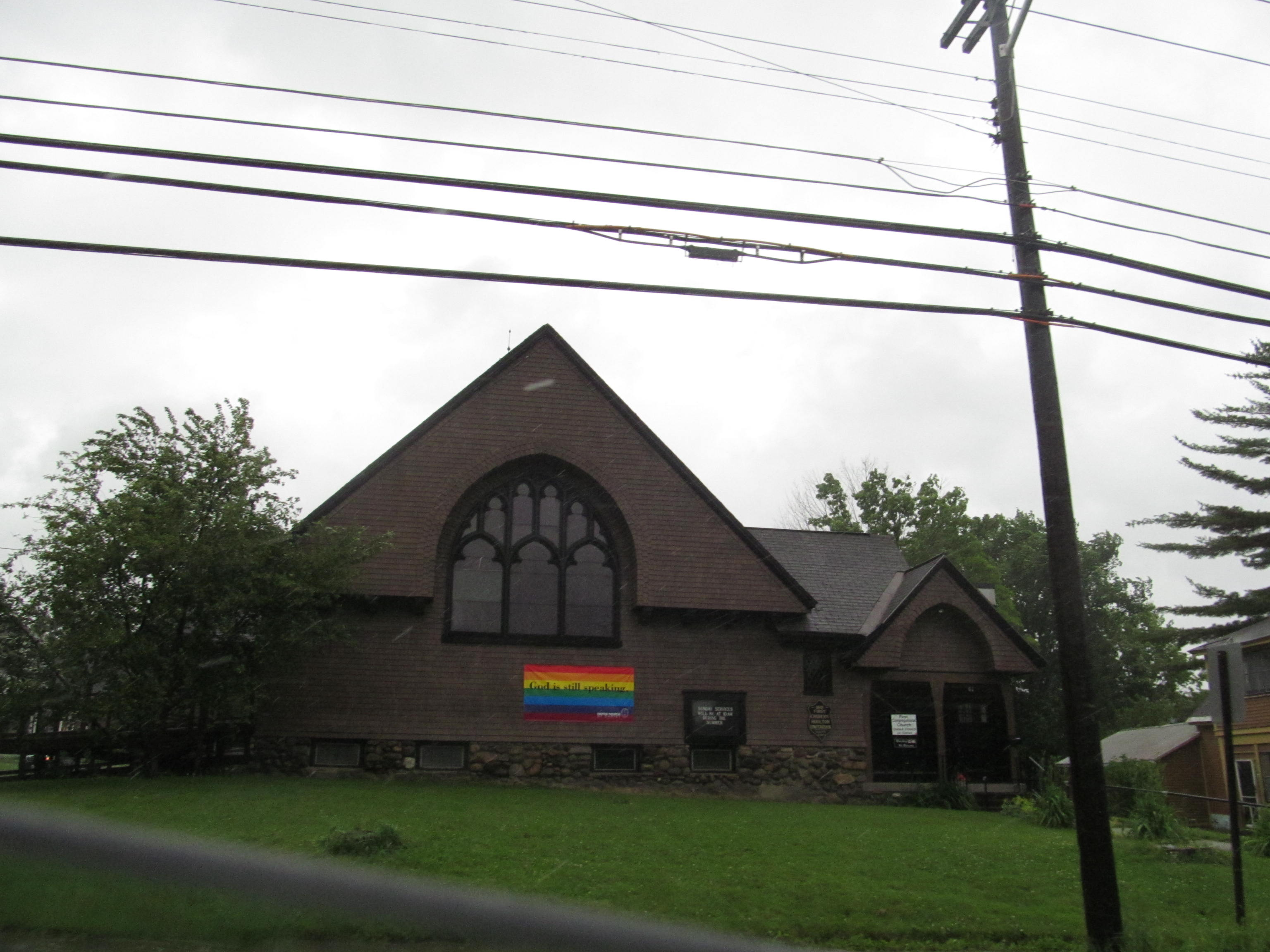

- Location within Maine Location within the United States
- Location: Military St., Houlton, Maine
- Coordinates: 46°7′27″N 67°50′15″W
- Area: less than one acre
- Built: 1902
- Architect: Edwin J. Lewis Jr.
- NRHP reference No.: 87000945
- Added to NRHP: June 25, 1987

The Unitarian Church of Houlton is a historic church building on Military Street in Houlton, Maine. Designed by Edwin J. Lewis Jr., and built in 1902 for an 1835 congregation, it is an architecturally eclectic structure, exhibiting medieval and Gothic features in wood. The building was listed on the National Register of Historic Places in 1987.

== Description and history ==
The Unitarian Church of Houlton stands at the southwest corner of Kelleran and Military Streets (the latter being United States Route 2), east of the town's downtown business district. It is a roughly rectangular structure, with a shingled exterior above a fieldstone foundation, and with a wealth of asymmetrical details. Its main facade faces north, featuring a large Gothic window in a recess in the main gable, and an entrance pavilion to the right under a similar but smaller arched recess. Gabled transepts project to either side. The entries and surrounds are decorated with heavy medieval-style timberwork, styling which is carried into the building's Gothic interior.

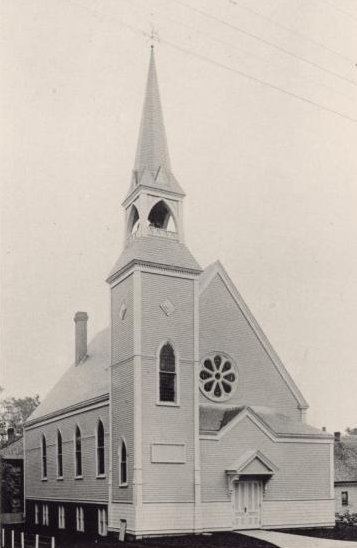
The congregation's second church, c. 1895

The Unitarian congregation was established in Houlton 1835. Its first church was severely damaged by fire in 1888, and its second was destroyed in a major fire in 1902 that damaged a significant portion of the town. This building was designed by Boston-based architect Edwin J. Lewis Jr., and was completed in 1902.

== See also ==
- National Register of Historic Places in Aroostook County, Maine
