= All Souls Church (Braintree, Massachusetts) =

Historic church in Massachusetts, United States

- U.S. National Register of Historic Places
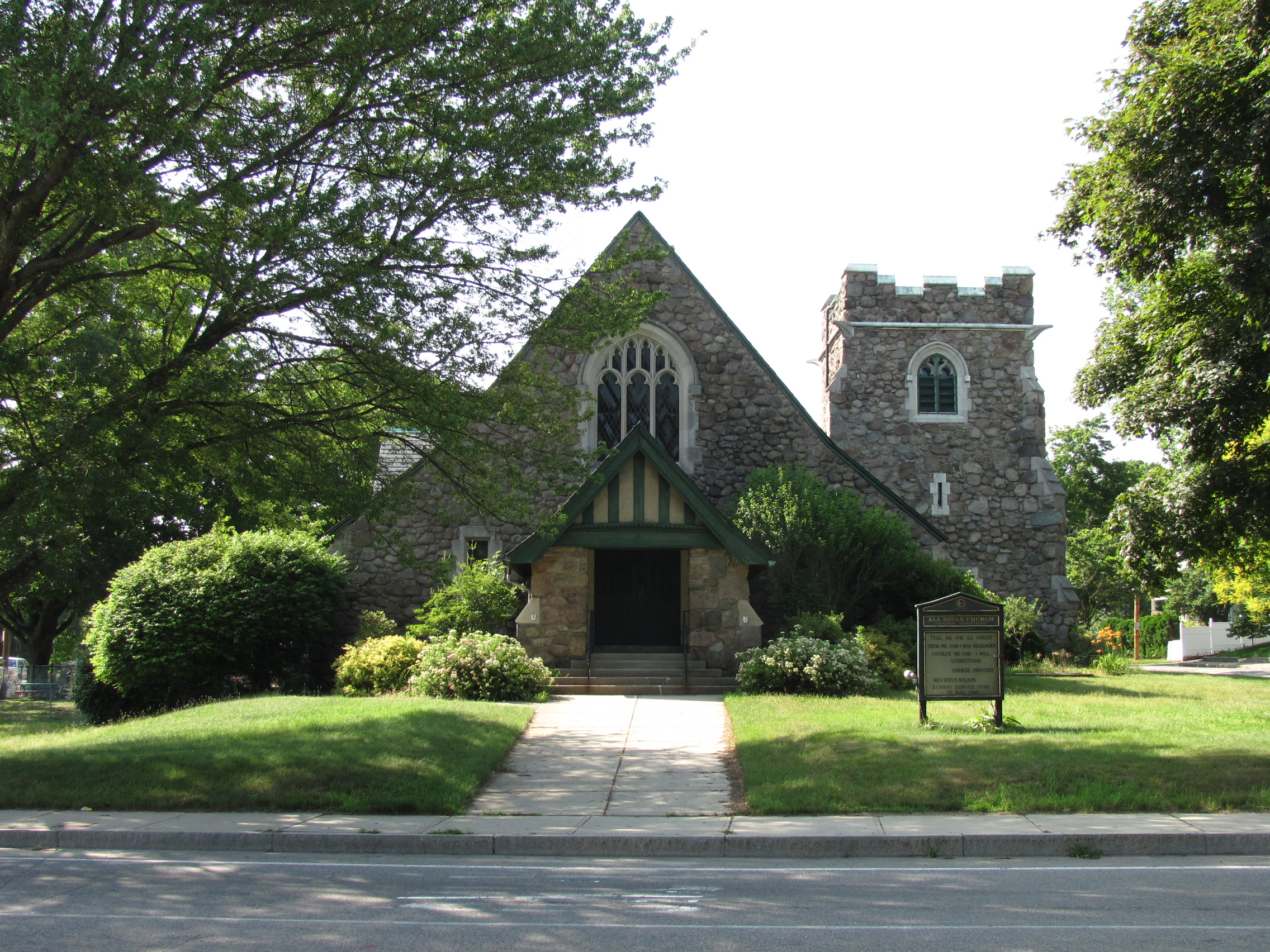
- All Souls Church in 2010

- Location within Massachusetts Location within the United States
- Location: 196 Elm Street, Braintree, Massachusetts
- Coordinates: 42°13′23″N 71°0′2″W
- Built: 1904
- Architect: Edwin J. Lewis Jr.
- Architectural style: English Revival
- NRHP reference No.: 15000389
- Added to NRHP: July 7, 2015

All Souls Church, also known as All Souls Unitarian Universalist Church of Braintree, is a church on the National Register of Historic Places, it is located at 196 Elm Street in Braintree, Massachusetts. The building is a large fieldstone structure, in a cruciform plan with a square tower that has a crenellated top. The gable ends are decorated with bargeboard, and the entrance is set under a gabled entry porch below a large window with Gothic tracery. The church was designed by Boston architect Edwin J. Lewis Jr. and built in 1905 for a congregation organized in 1900; it is Braintree's first stone church building. Land for the building was donated by George O. Wales, a leading force in uniting Braintree's Unitarian and Universalist congregations.

The building was listed on the National Register of Historic Places in 2015.

== See also ==
- National Register of Historic Places listings in Norfolk County, Massachusetts
