= Wollaston Unitarian Church =

Historic church in Massachusetts, United States

- U.S. National Register of Historic Places
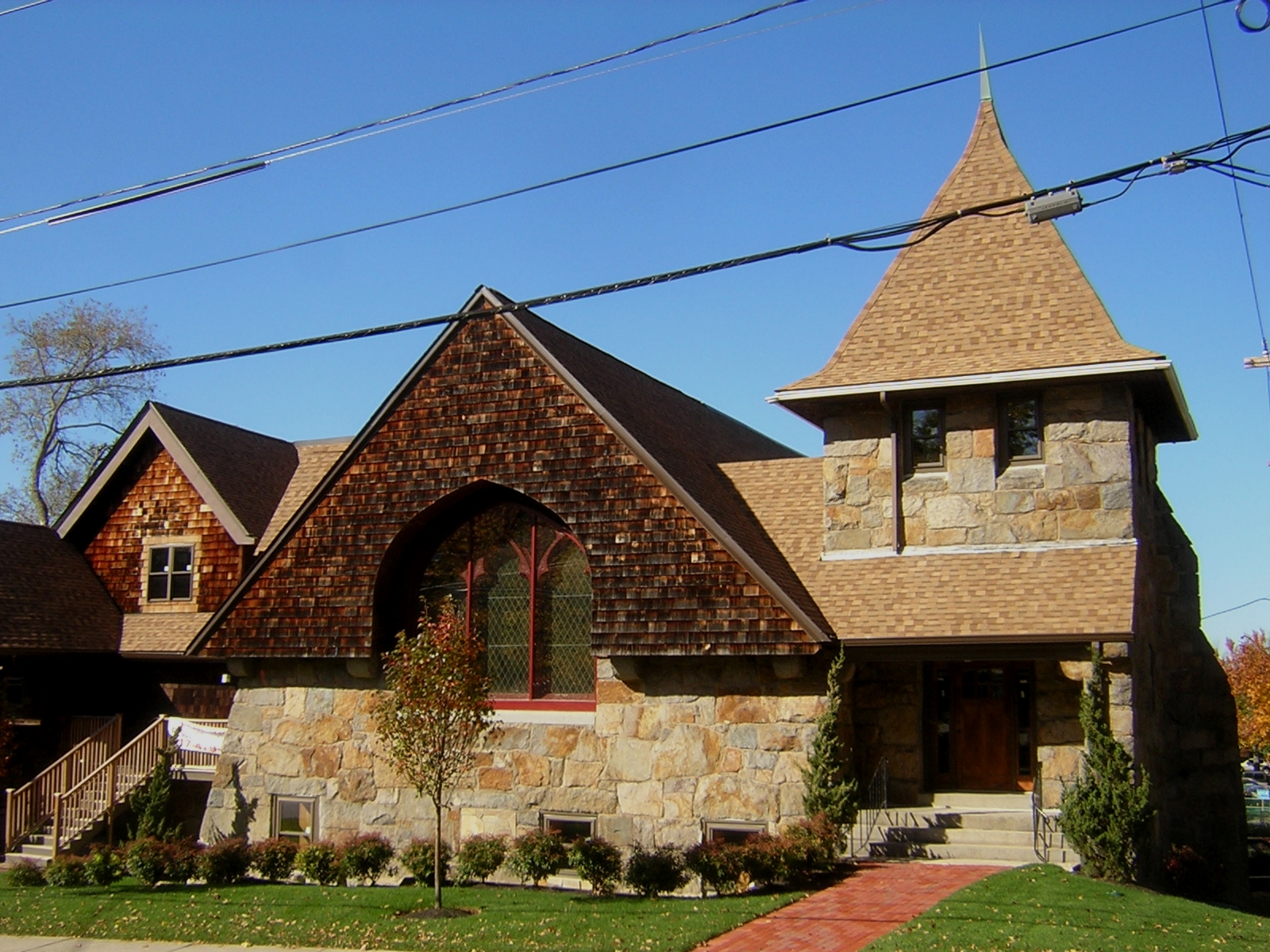

- Location within Massachusetts Location within the United States
- Location: 155 Beale St., Quincy, Massachusetts
- Coordinates: 42°15′51″N 71°1′19″W
- Built: 1888
- Architect: Edwin J. Lewis Jr.
- Architectural style: Shingle Style
- MPS: Quincy MRA
- NRHP reference No.: 89001318
- Added to NRHP: September 20, 1989

The Wollaston Unitarian Church, more recently a former home of the St. Catherine's Greek Orthodox Church, is a historic church building at 155 Beale Street in Quincy, Massachusetts. Built in 1888 to a design by Edwin J. Lewis Jr., it is a prominent local example of Shingle Style architecture. It was added to the National Register of Historic Places in 1989. The building has been converted to residential use.

== Architecture and building history ==
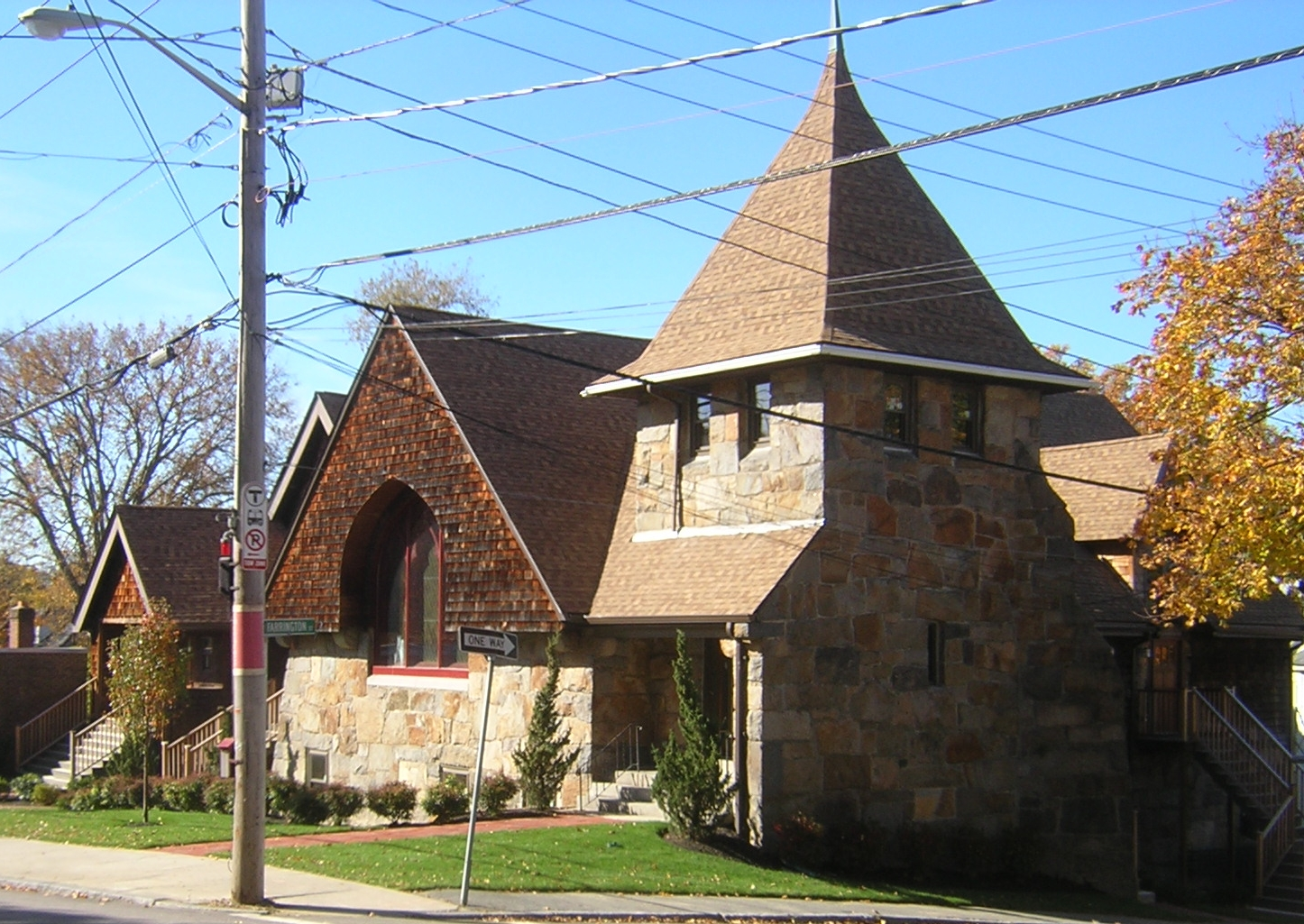
Wollaston Unitarian Church

The church is located at the western corner of Beale and Farrington Streets in central Quincy. It is a fine example of Shingle Style architecture, with asymmetrical massing that emphasizes horizontal structure. Its ground floor is finished in granite, while the upper parts are clad in wooden shingles. A squat square tower stands at the corner, topped by a pyramidal roof with flared eaves, with the main entrance set in a recess at its base. The street-facing main block gable features a broad Gothic-arched recess, in which is mounted a stained glass window. The parish house, built in 1915, is integrated with the main structure, south of the main gable facing Beale Street.

The church was built in 1888 for a Unitarian congregation established the previous year. The church was the third to be built in the Wollaston area in 20 years, reflective of the area's burgeoning growth. The Wollaston Church merged with United First Parish Church in Quincy in 1960. The Beale Street building was purchased for $40,000 by St. Catherine's, a Greek Orthodox congregation organized in 1958. St. Catherine's grew over the years, and in 2004 the congregation moved to a new building in Braintree.

== See also ==
- National Register of Historic Places listings in Quincy, Massachusetts
