= Second Unitarian Church =

Historic church in Massachusetts, United States

- U.S. National Register of Historic Places
- U.S. Historic district – Contributing property
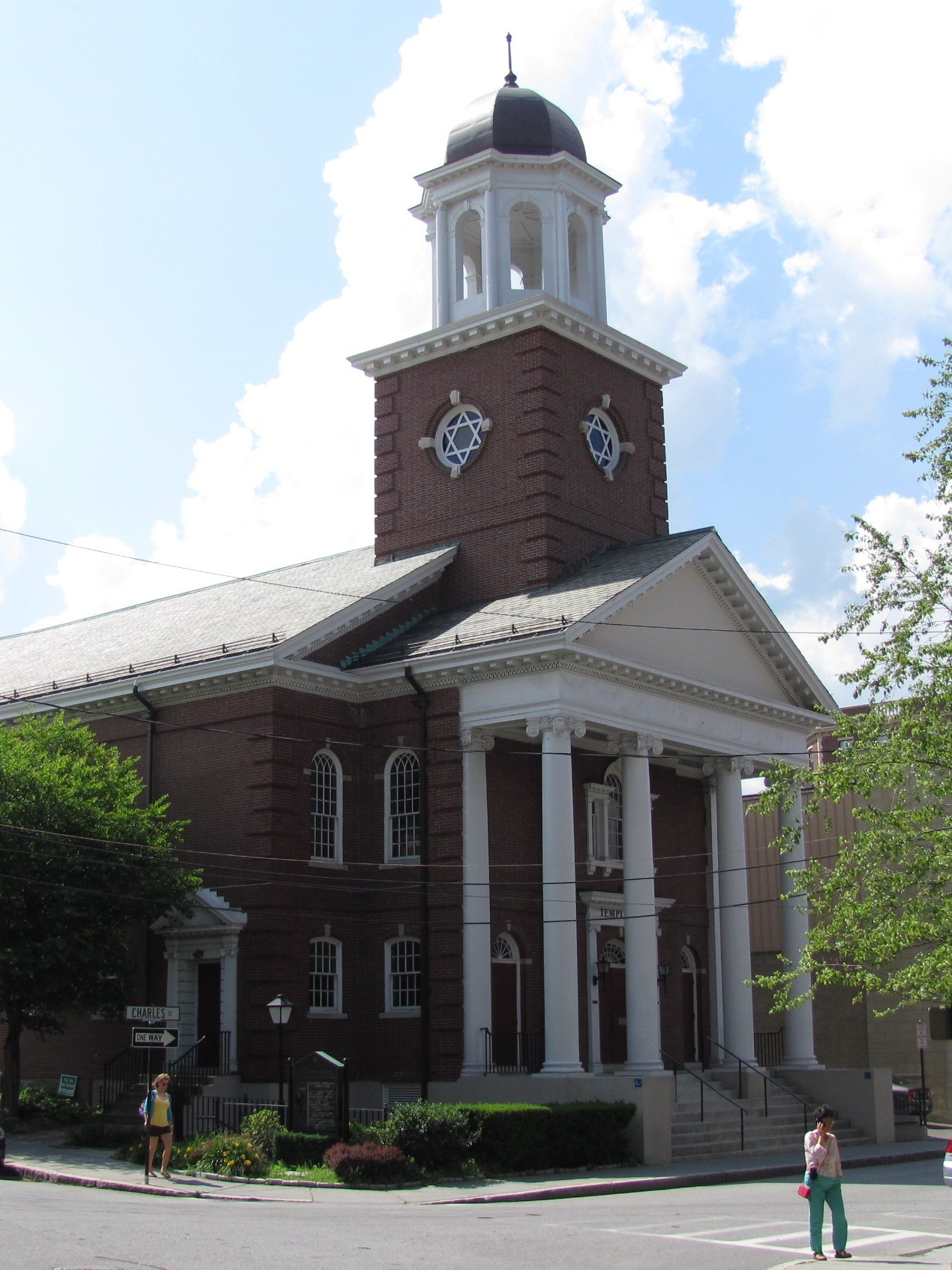
- Second Unitarian Church

- Location within Massachusetts Location within the United States
- Location: 11 Charles St., Brookline, Massachusetts
- Coordinates: 42°21′6″N 71°07′46″W
- Built: 1916
- Architect: Edwin J. Lewis Jr.
- Architectural style: Colonial Revival, Georgian Revival
- Part of: Beacon Street Historic District (ID85003322)
- MPS: Brookline MRA
- NRHP reference No.: 85003315

Significant dates
- Added to NRHP: October 17, 1985
- Designated CP: October 17, 1985

The Second Unitarian Church is a historic church and synagogue building at 11 Charles Street in Brookline, Massachusetts. Built in 1916 for a Unitarian congregation, it was acquired by the innovative Reform Jewish Temple Sinai congregation in 1944. It is a high quality example of Colonial Revival/Georgian Revival architecture, and was listed on the National Register of Historic Places in 1985.

== Description and history ==
The Temple Sinai building is located on the north side of Charles Street, a side street just south of Beacon Street on the west side of Coolidge Corner. The building's lot originally fronted on Beacon Street, but has been subdivided. The building is a two-story brick structure, with a front-facing gable roof, Greek temple portico, and tower with octagonal cupola. The building corners have brick quoining, and it has round-arch windows capped by limestone keystones.

The building was erected in 1916 by the Second Unitarian Church, a congregation established in 1896 that had been meeting at a shared chapel in the Longwood area. The building was designed by Boston architect Edwin J. Lewis Jr., and is based on the Christ Church in Alexandria, Virginia. In 1944 the building was purchased by Temple Sinai, a Reform Jewish congregation established in 1939. That congregation was the first new Reform congregation to be founded in the Greater Boston area in 84 years, and is credited with introducing a number of changes to the worship and governance practices of Reform congregations, including equal seating for all congregants, and the right of women to vote in its organization.

== See also ==
- National Register of Historic Places listings in Brookline, Massachusetts
