= Edwin J. Lewis Jr. =

American architect (1859–1937)

Edwin J. Lewis Jr. FAIA
- Born: Edwin James Lewis Jr. May 1, 1859; Roxbury, Massachusetts, U.S.
- Died: October 16, 1937 (aged 78); Milton, Massachusetts, U.S.
- Occupation: Architect
- Buildings: Dedham Historical Society; Wollaston Unitarian Church; The Peabody; Unitarian Church of Houlton; All Souls Church; Dearborn School; Second Unitarian Church
- Burial place: Mount Auburn Cemetery
- Education: Massachusetts Institute of Technology, S.B. (1881)

Edwin J. Lewis Jr. FAIA (May 1, 1859 – October 16, 1937) was an American architect who designed numerous residential houses and churches in New England.

== Biography ==
Edwin James Lewis Jr. was born May 1, 1859, in Roxbury, Massachusetts. He was the son of Edwin James Lewis Sr. and Sarah Avery Richards. Lewis was educated at The English High School in Boston from which he graduated from in 1877, and received a Franklin Medal for his high academic success. He then attended the Massachusetts Institute of Technology and graduated in 1881 with a Bachelor of Science degree. After graduation, Lewis entered the Boston architectural firm of Peabody and Stearns. He remained at the firm until 1887, when he left to start his own private practice.

Over the course of his career, Lewis designed numerous suburban and rural residences, many of which were in the Ashmont neighborhood of Dorchester, Massachusetts. Lewis also designed nearly 35 churches in the United States and Canada.

In addition to his professional architectural career, Lewis served as secretary of the Boston Society of Architects for over a decade and was elected a Fellow of the American Institute of Architects. He was also a member of the Union Club of Boston, life member of The Bostonian Society, and a member and president of the Dorchester Historical Society.

Lewis was never married, and died October 16, 1937, at his home in Milton, Massachusetts. He was buried at Mount Auburn Cemetery.

== Works ==
- Dedham Historical Society (1886–1887) — 612 High St., Dedham, Massachusetts
- Fauntleroy Hall (c. 1886) — 42 Wenonah St., Roxbury, Massachusetts
- Wollaston Unitarian Church (1888) — 155 Beale St., Quincy, Massachusetts
- Keene Unitarian Universalist Church (1894) — 69 Washington St., Keene, New Hampshire
- The Peabody (1896–1897) — 195–197 Ashmont St., Dorchester, Massachusetts
- Draper Memorial Church (1898) — 65 Hopedale St., Hopedale, Massachusetts
- Nathaniel Bradlee Doggett House (1902) — 2018 Commonwealth Ave., Brighton, Massachusetts
- Unitarian Church of Houlton (1902) — 61 Military St., Houlton, Maine
- Bulfinch Place Church (1904) — Bowdoin Square, Boston, Massachusetts
- All Souls' Church (1905) — 196 Elm St., Brookline, Massachusetts
- Mrs. Charles E. Eddy House (1905) — Newton, Massachusetts
- Danielson-Lincoln Memorial Library (1905) — Brimfield, Massachusetts
- Dearborn School (1905) — 25 Ambrose St., Roxbury, Massachusetts
- "Rockledge" house for David C. Percival (1906) — Marblehead, Massachusetts
- All Souls' Church (1907) — 60 Huntington St., New London, Connecticut
- New England Homestead for Walter Baker & Company at the Jamestown Exposition (1907)
- "Felsenmeer" house for Hon. J. Sloat Fassett (c. 1909) — Grapevine Cove, Gloucester, Massachusetts
- Andover Unitarian Church (1910) — Andover, New Hampshire
- First Parish Church of Dorchester Parish hall expansion (1913) — Dorchester, Massachusetts
- Second Unitarian Church (1916) — 11 Charles St., Brookline, Massachusetts
- Church of Christ, Scientist (1917) — 20 Greenleaf St., Quincy, Massachusetts
- Hopedale Community House (1922) — 43 Hope St., Hopedale, Massachusetts
- Dorchester Music Hall (now the O'Hearn Storage Building) — Fields Corner, Dorchester, Massachusetts

== Gallery ==
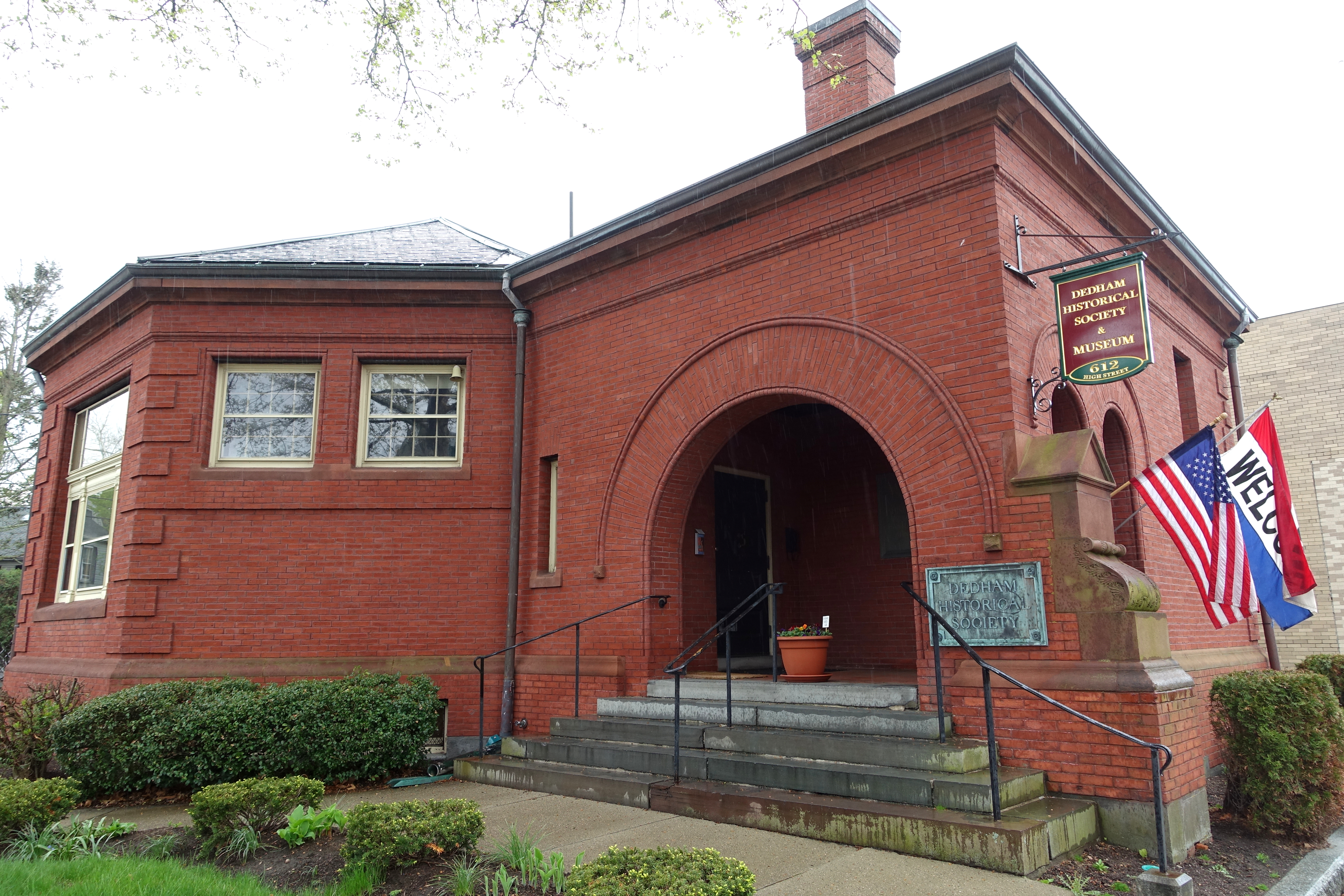
Dedham Historical Society

Fauntleroy Hall

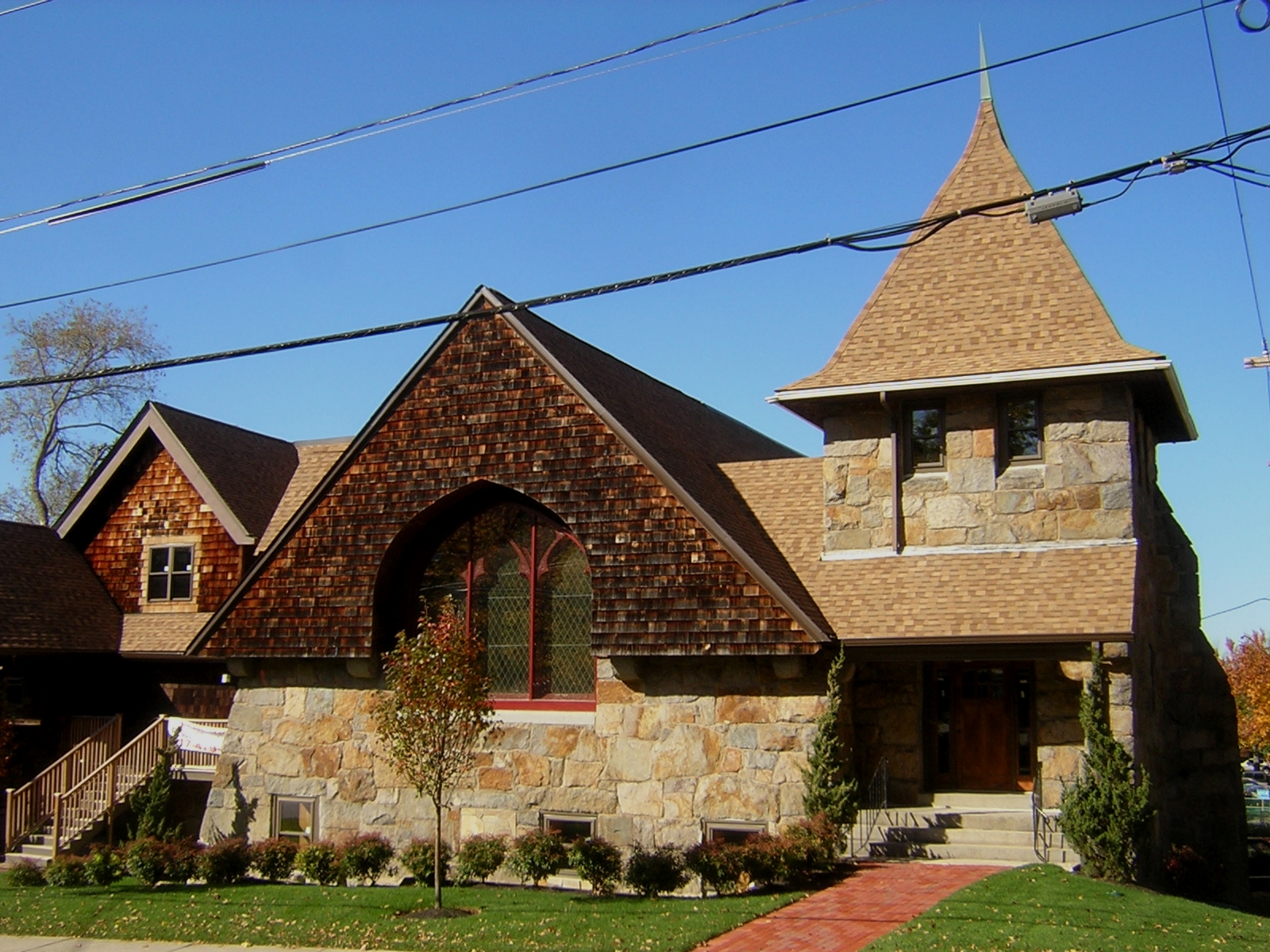
Wollaston Unitarian Church

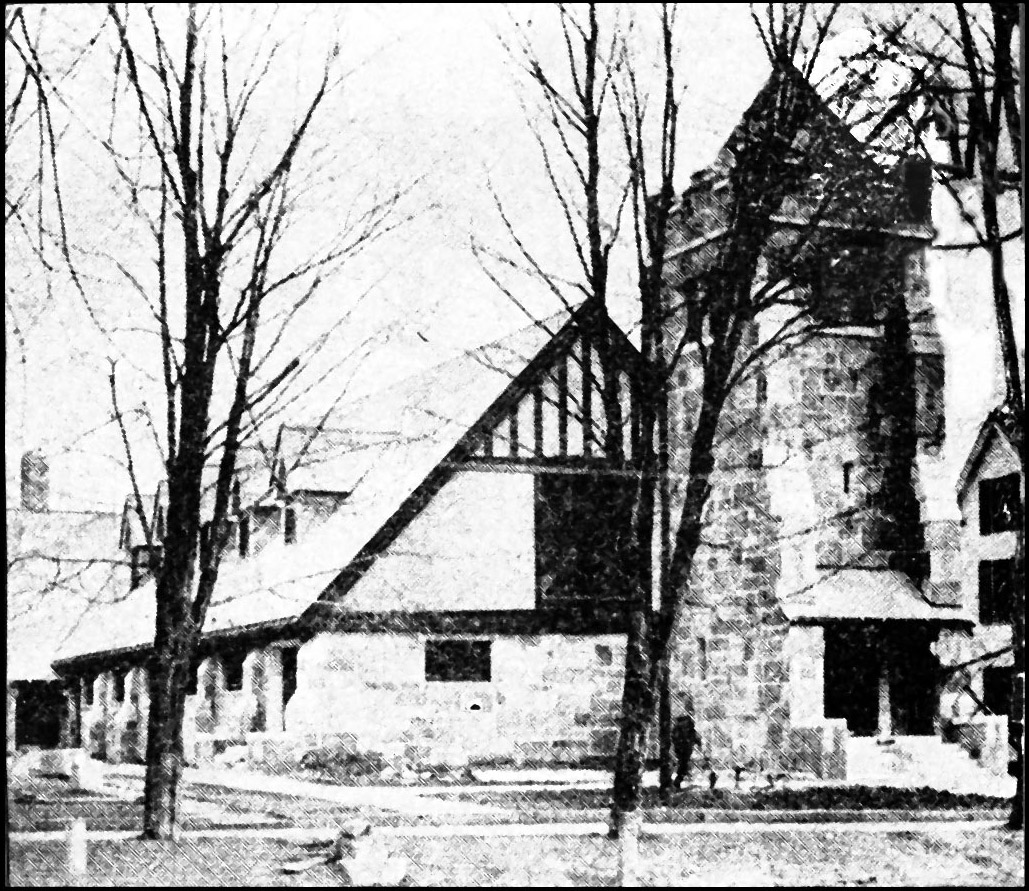
Keene Unitarian Church

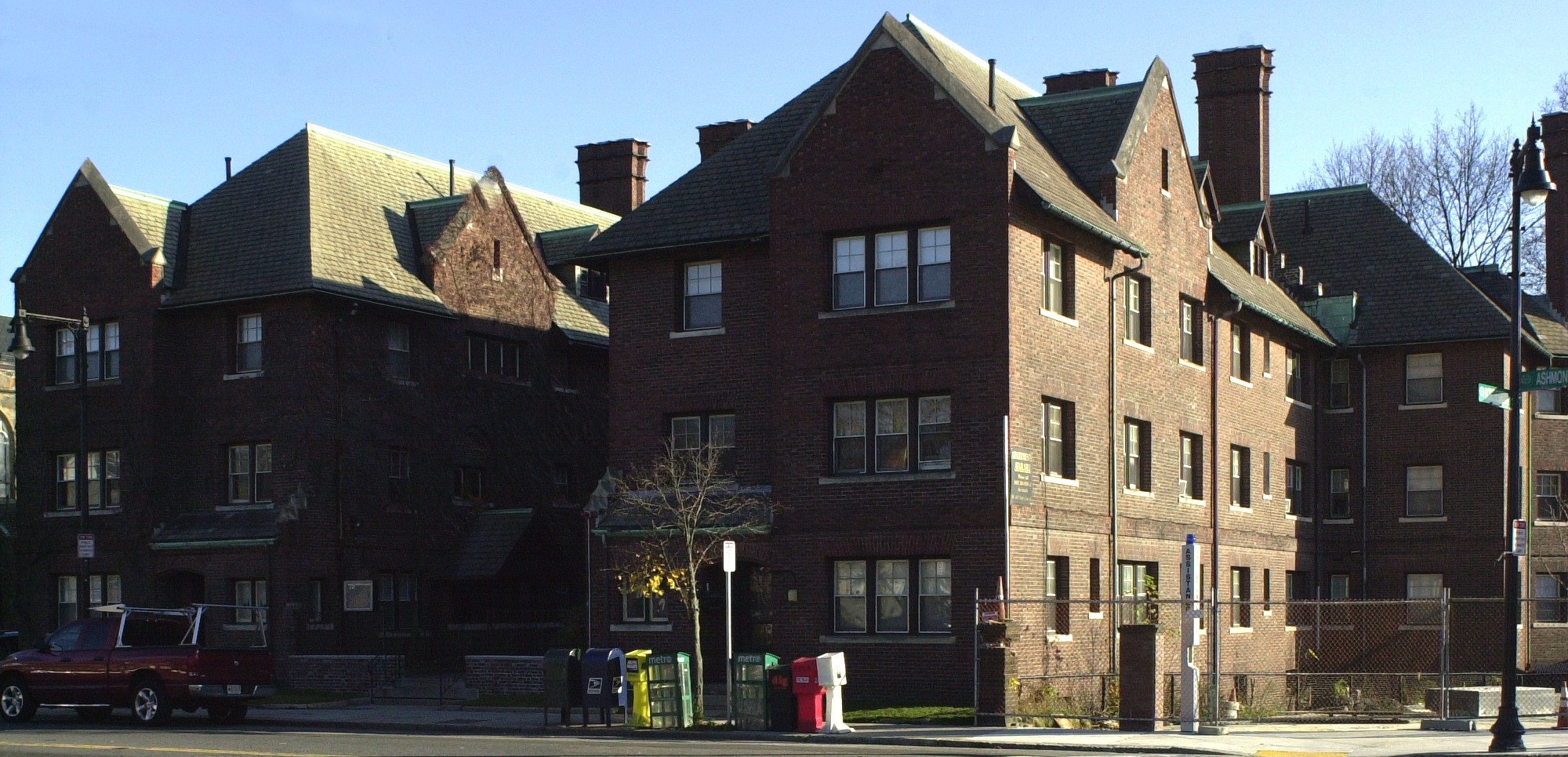
The Peabody

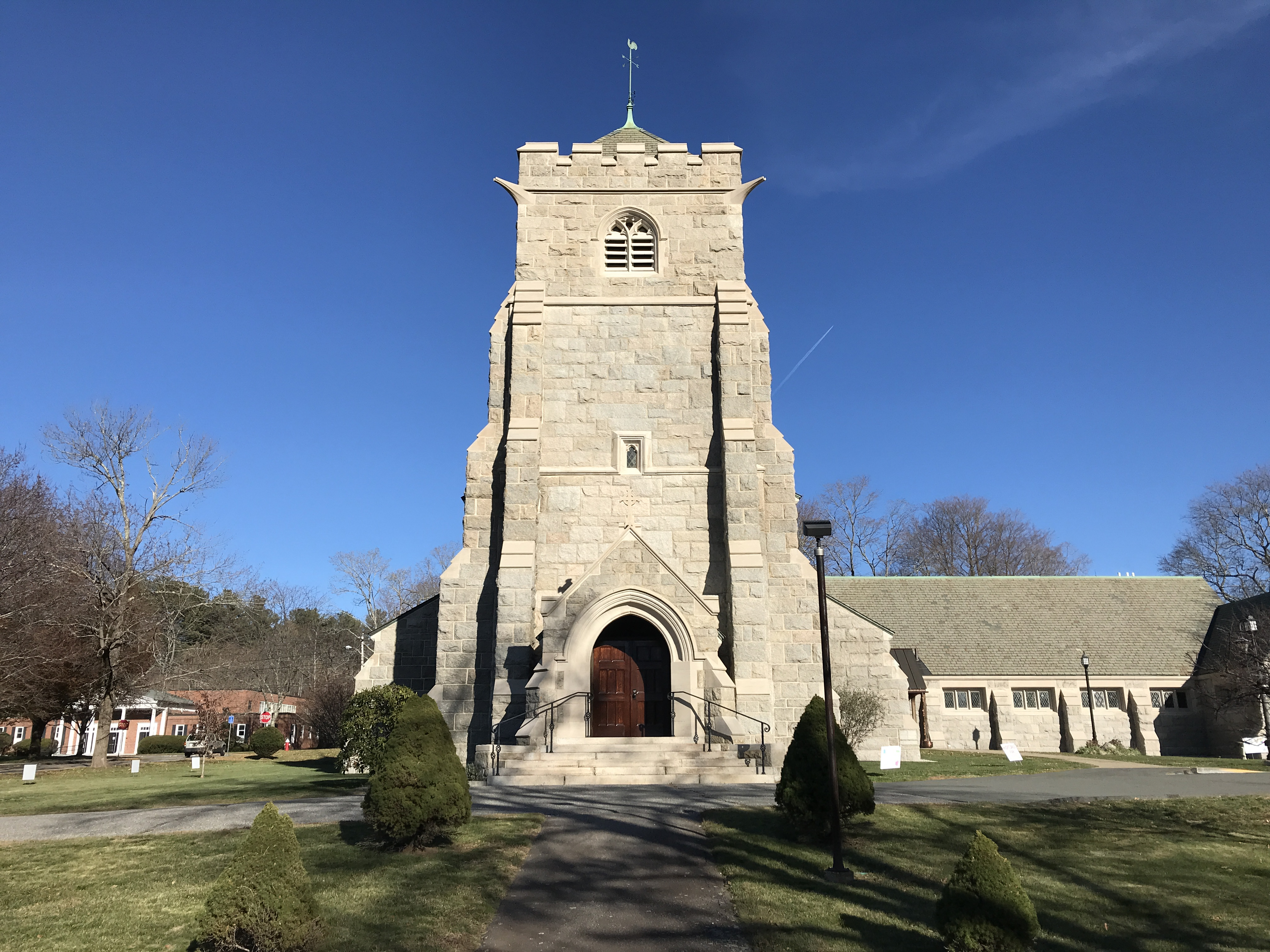
Draper Memorial Church

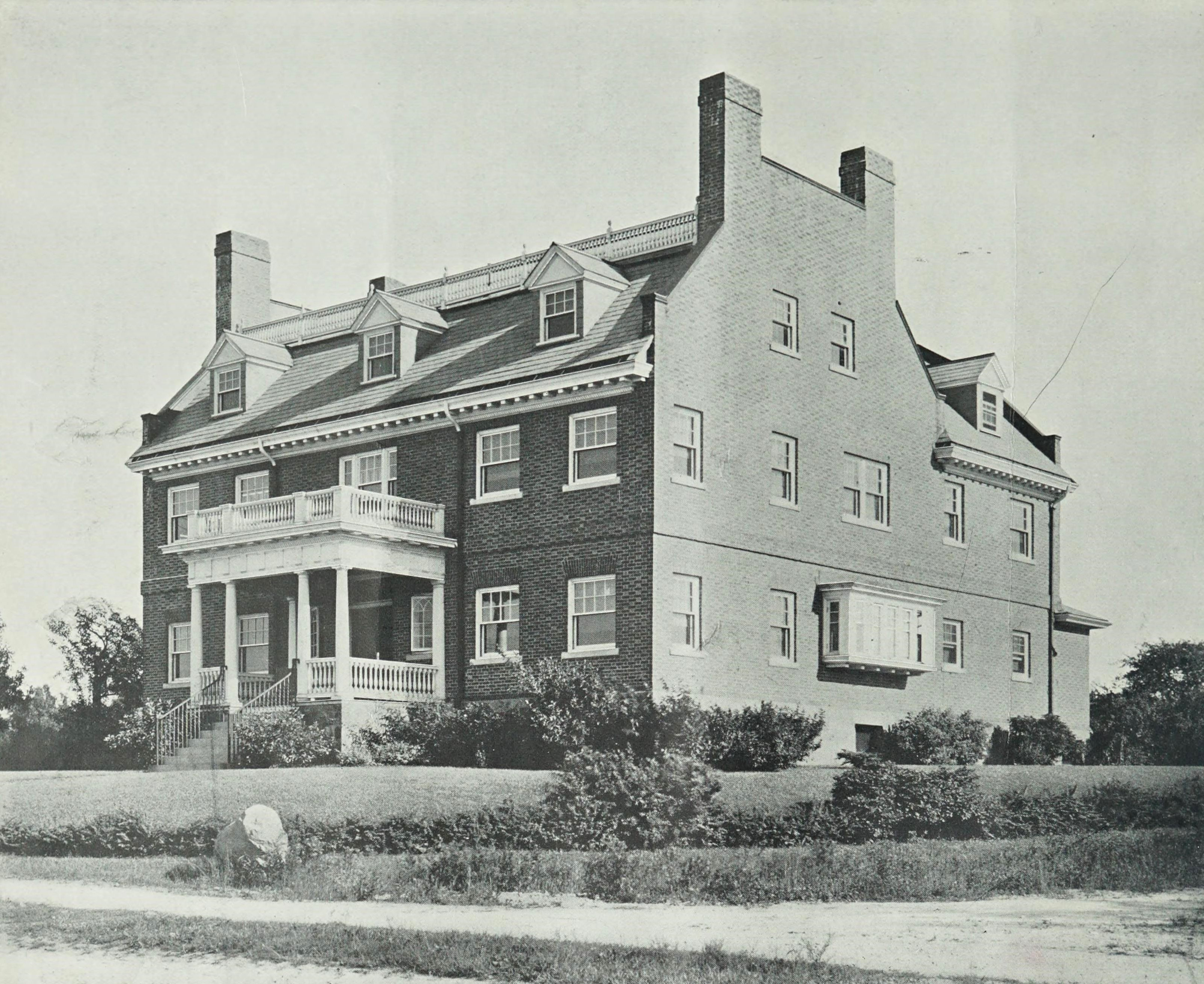
Nathaniel Doggett House

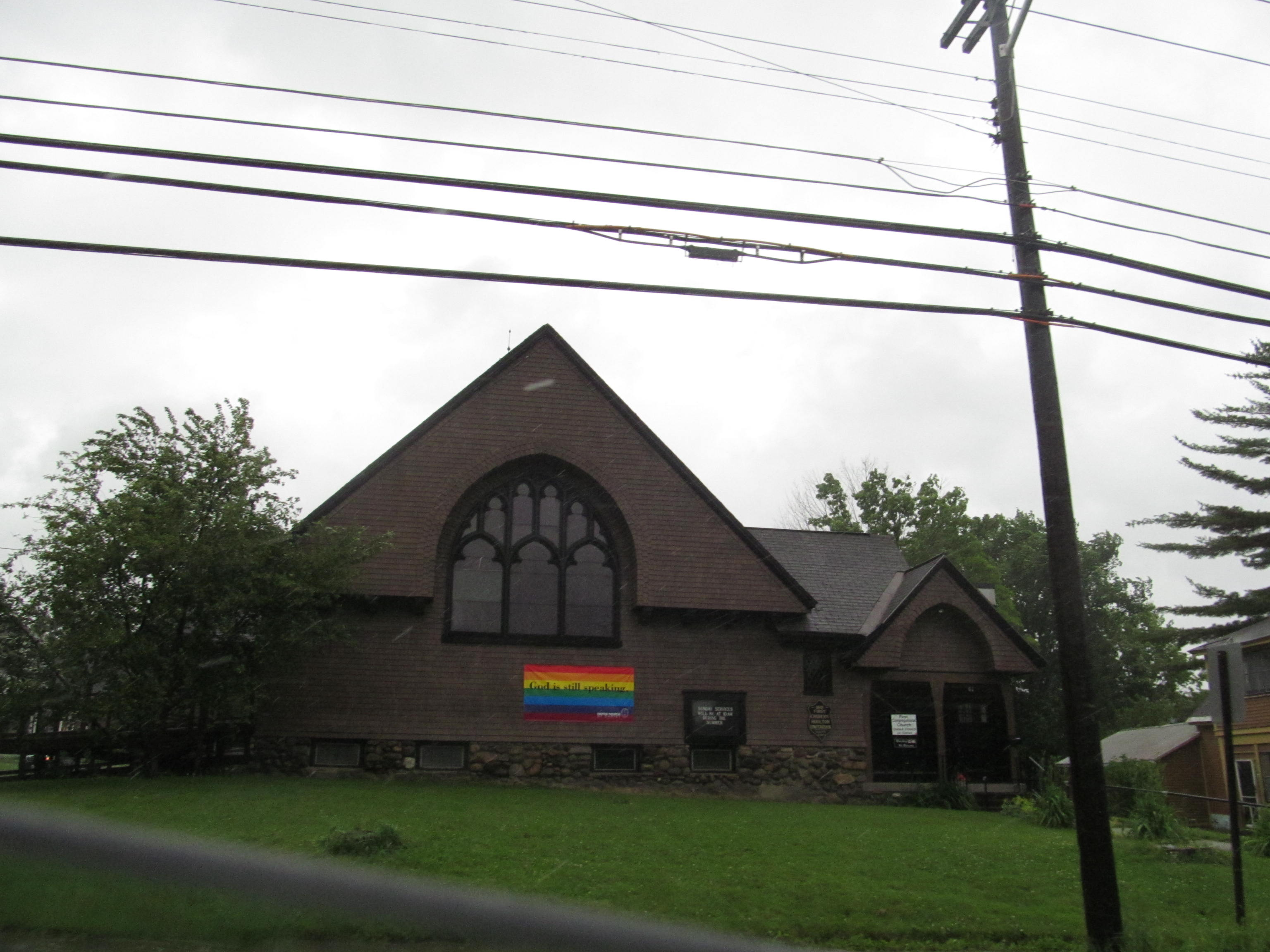
Unitarian Church of Houlton

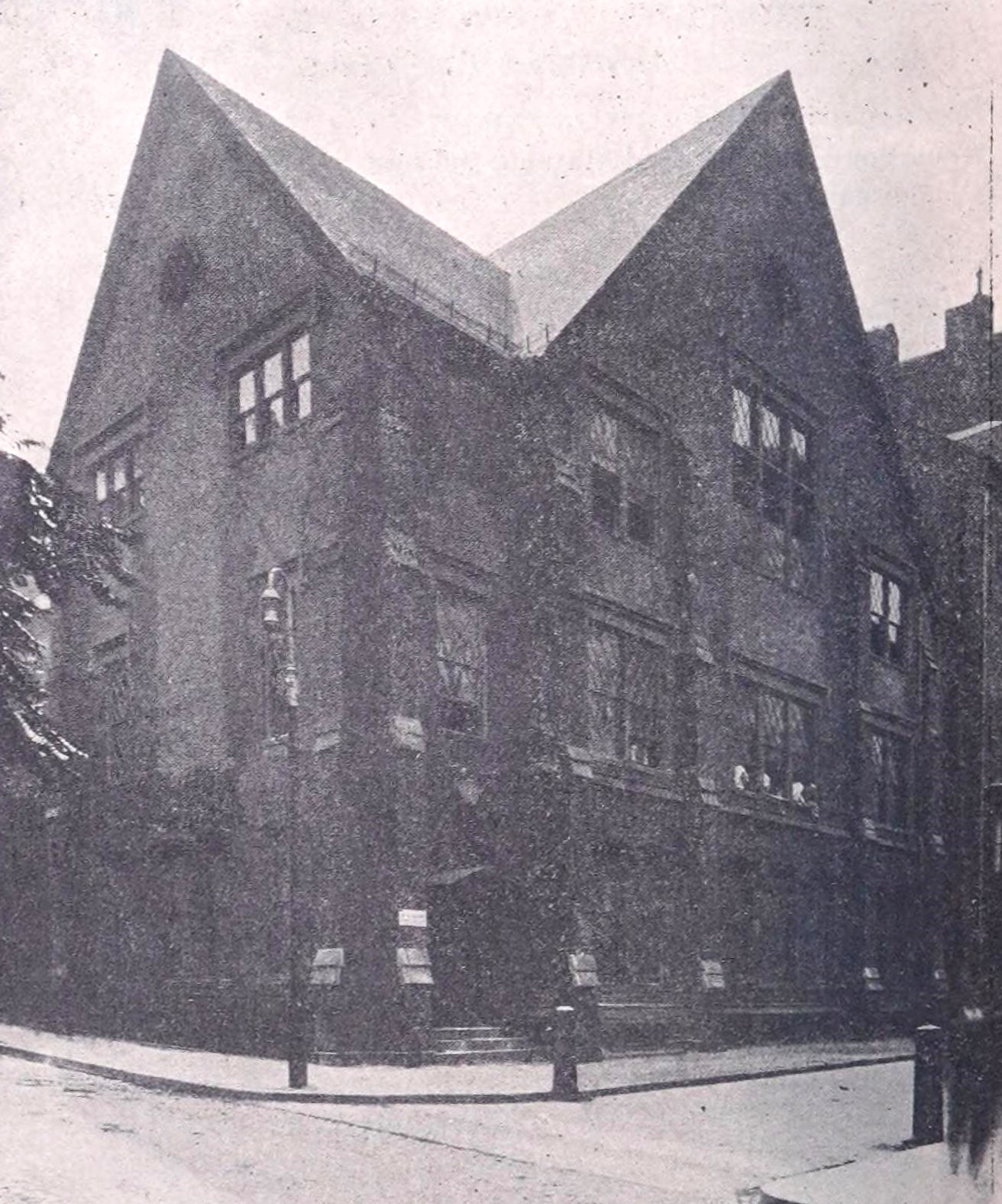
Bulfinch Place Church

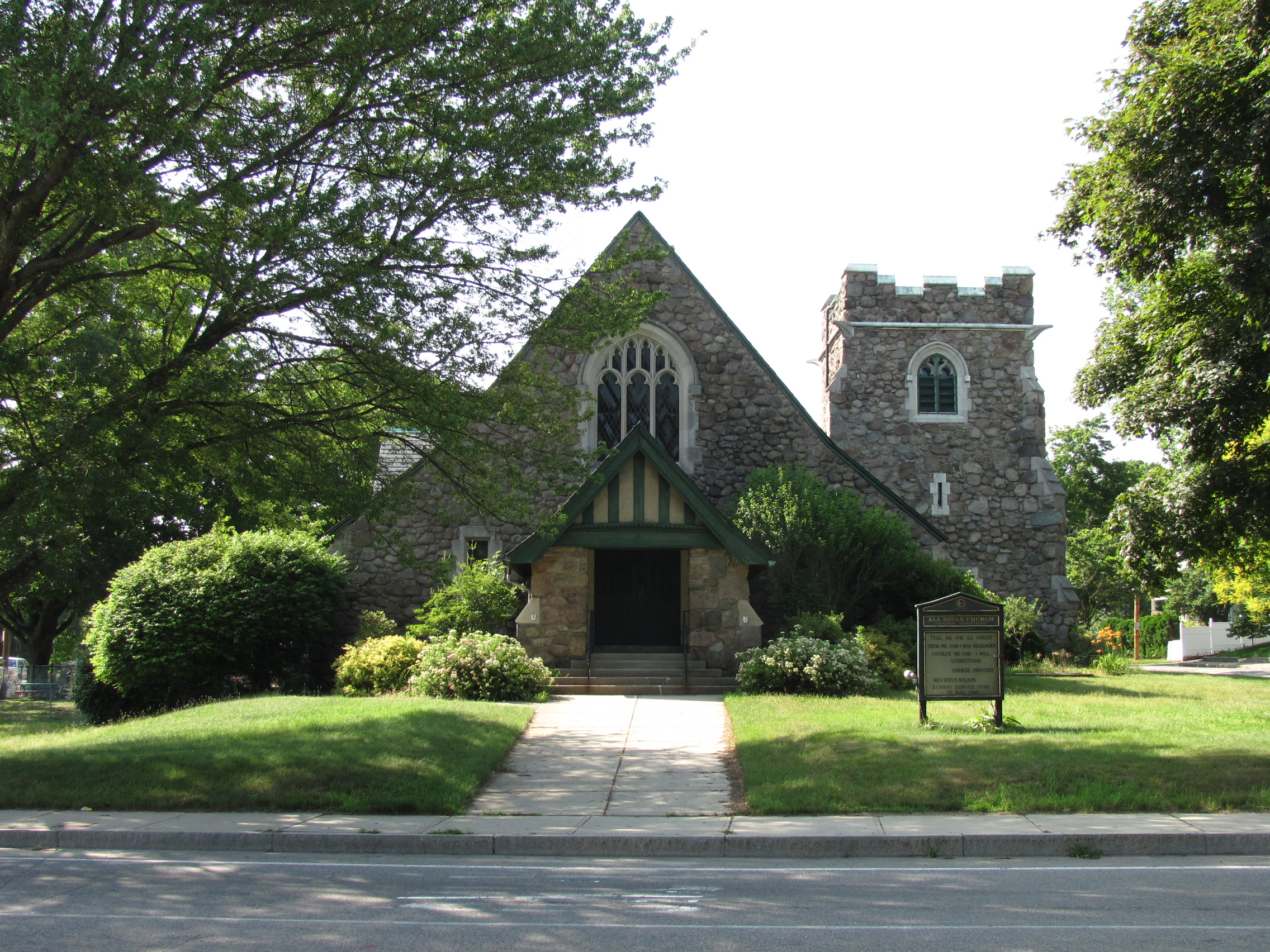
All Souls' Church, Braintree

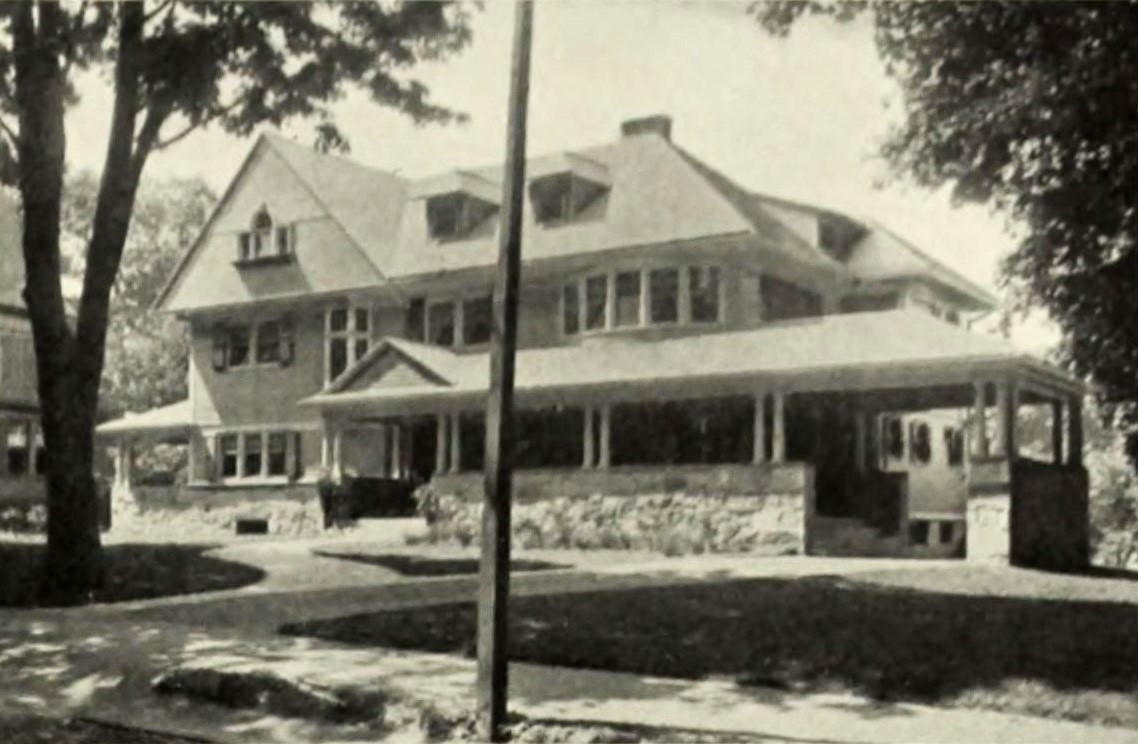
Mrs. Charles E. Eddy House

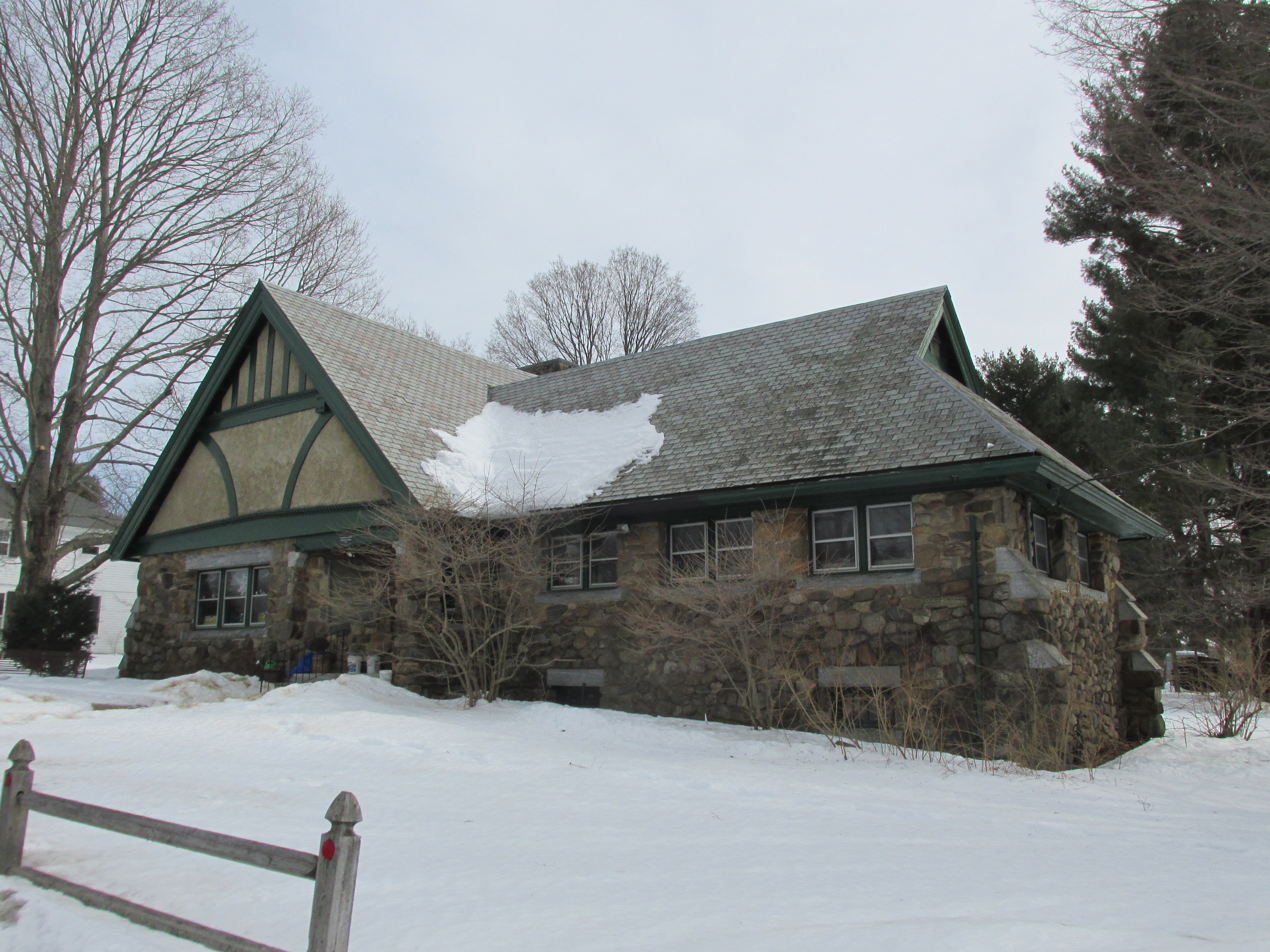
Danielson-Lincoln Memorial Library

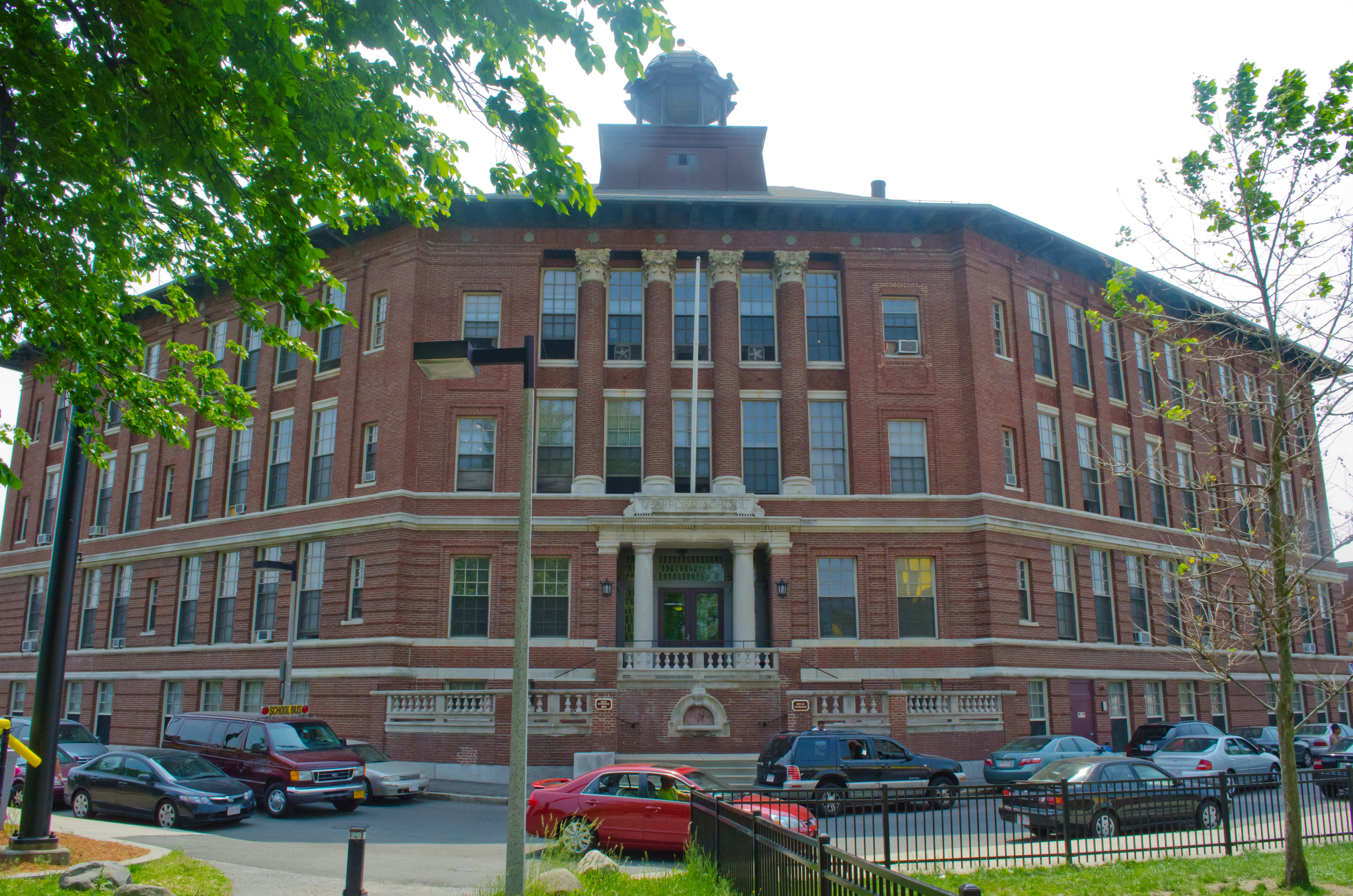
Dearborn School

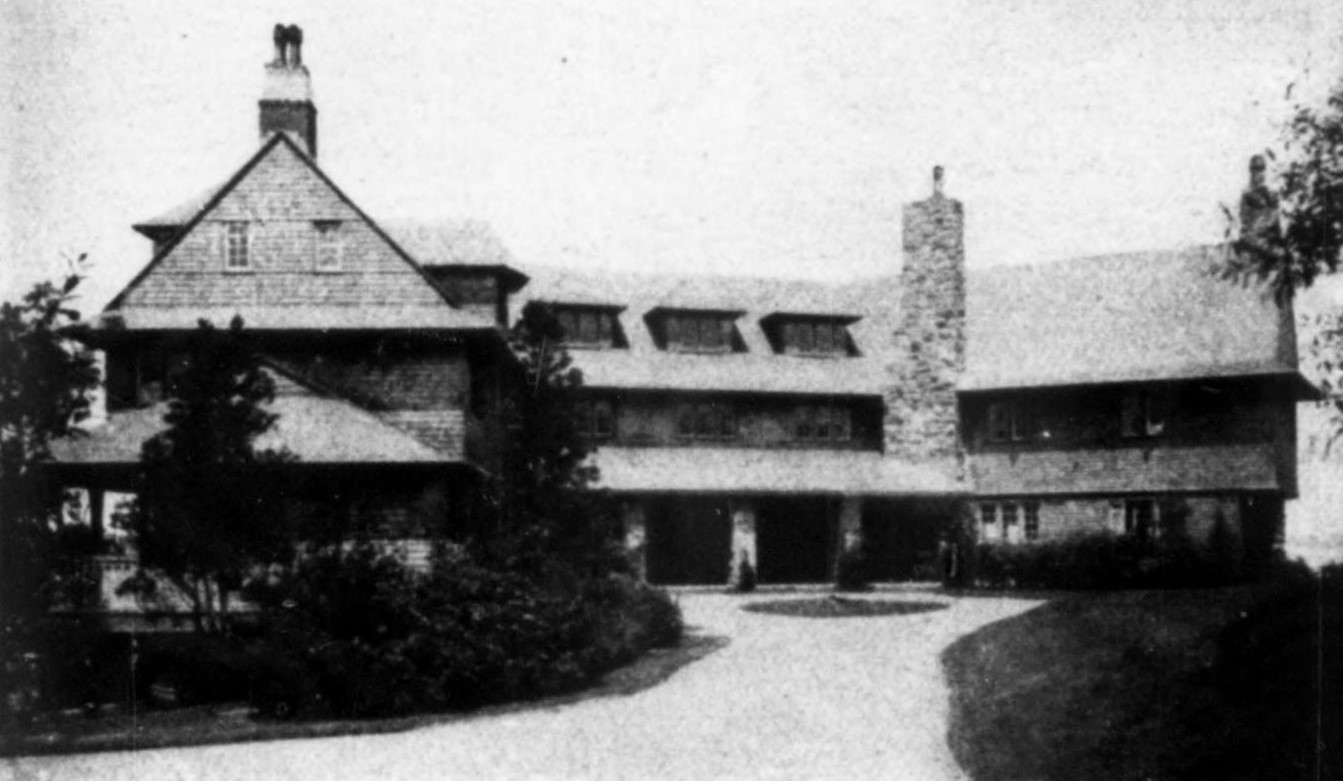
"Rockledge"

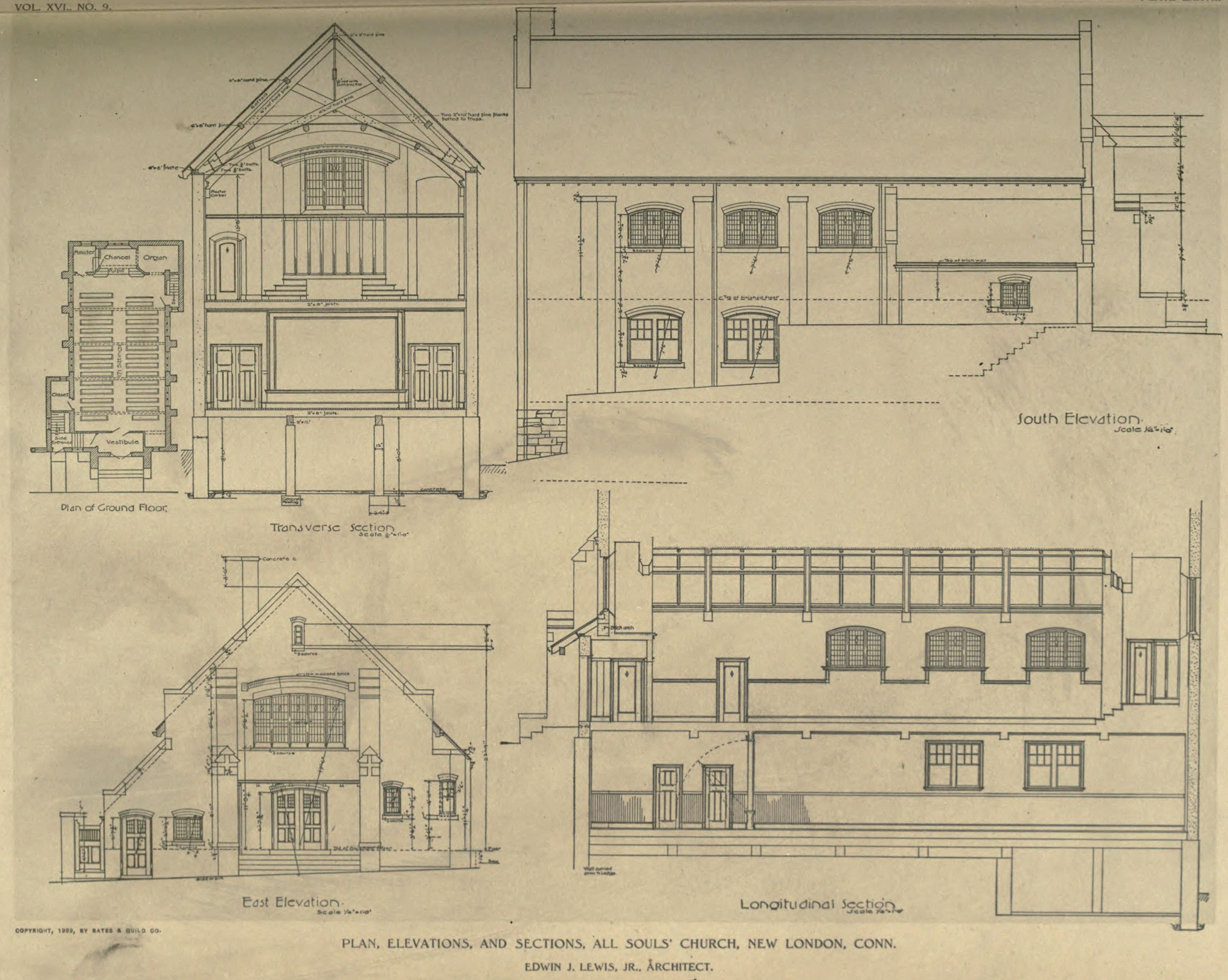
All Souls' Church, New London

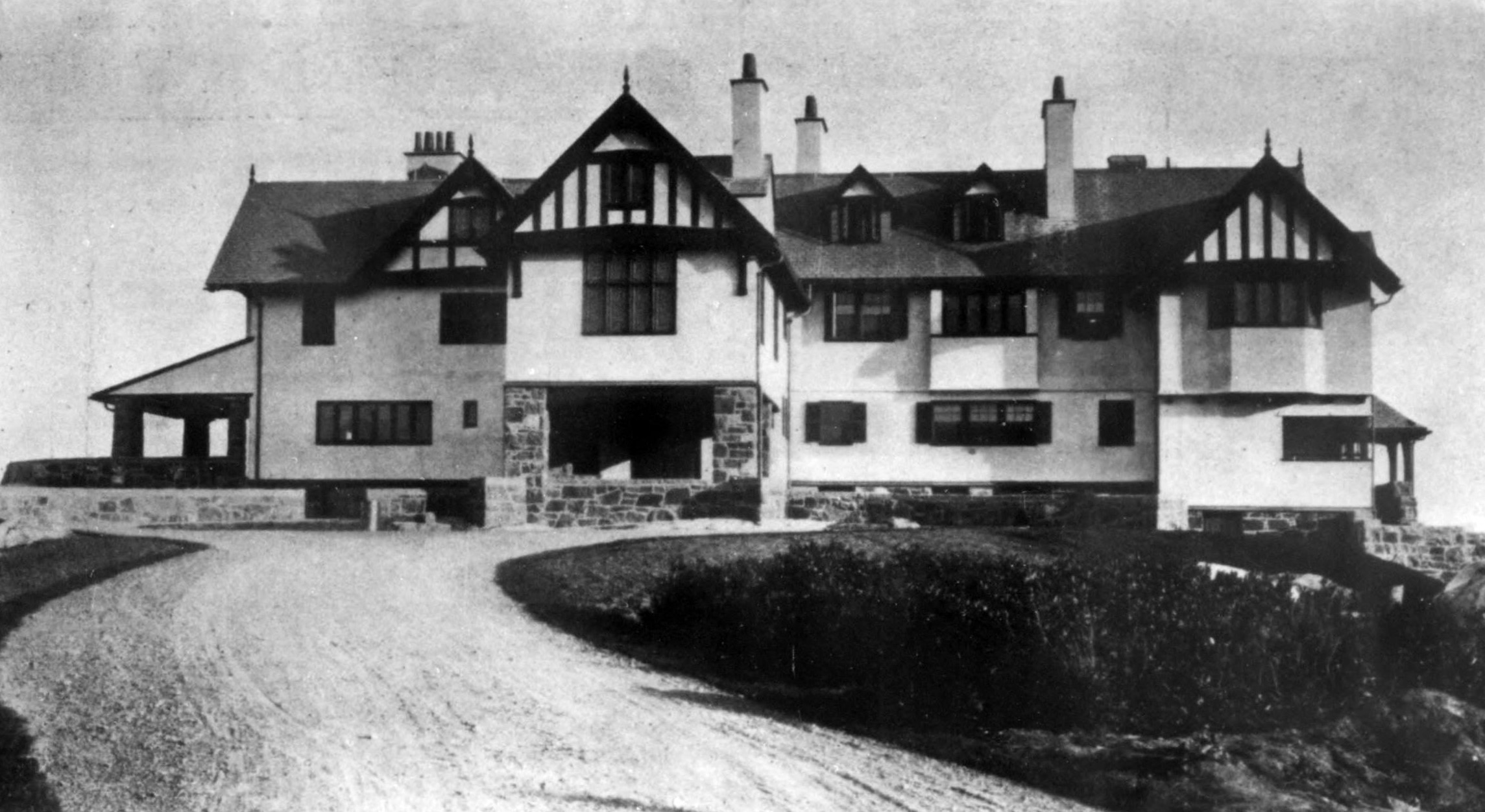
"Felsenmeer" house of J. Sloat Fassett

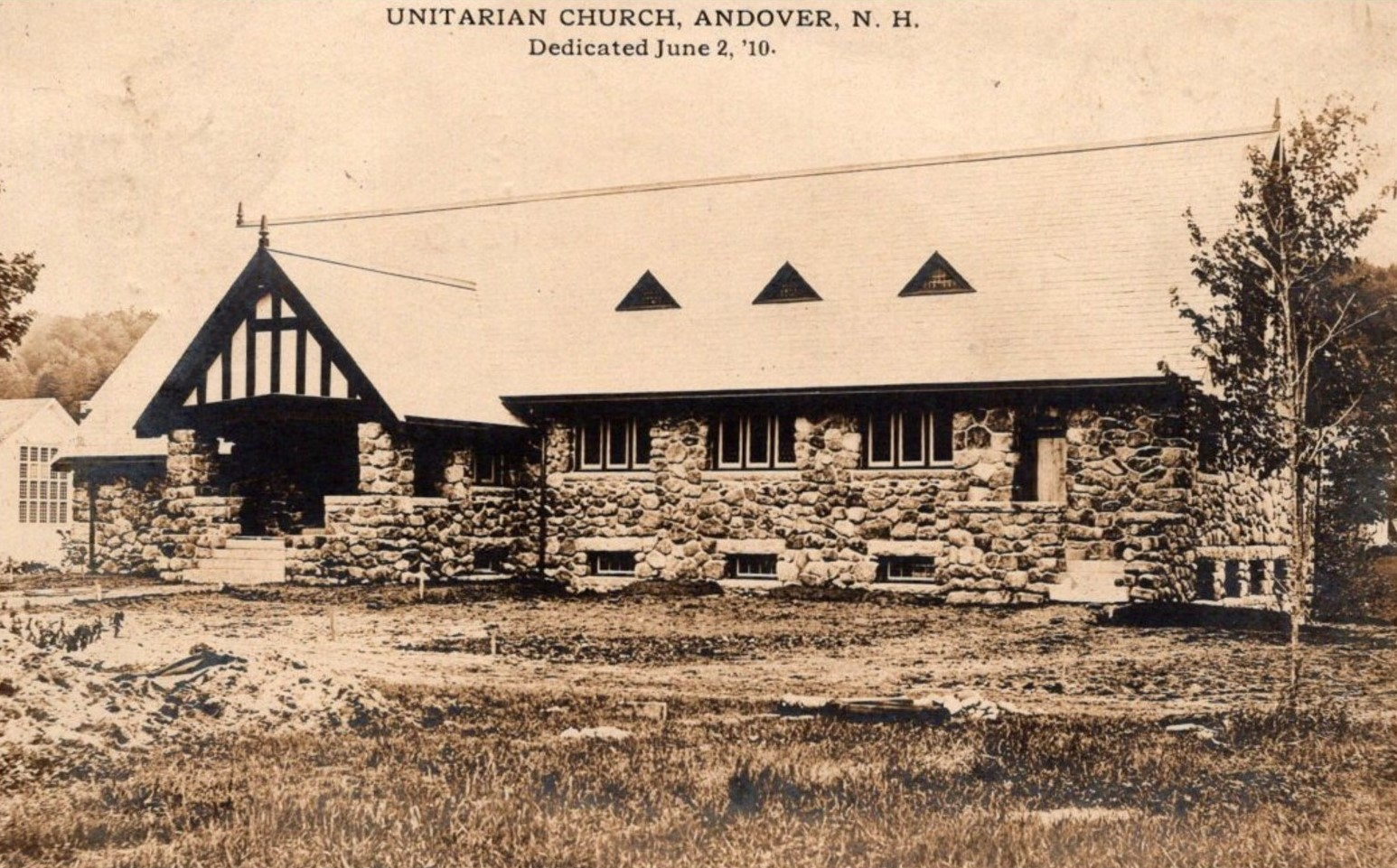
Andover Unitarian Church

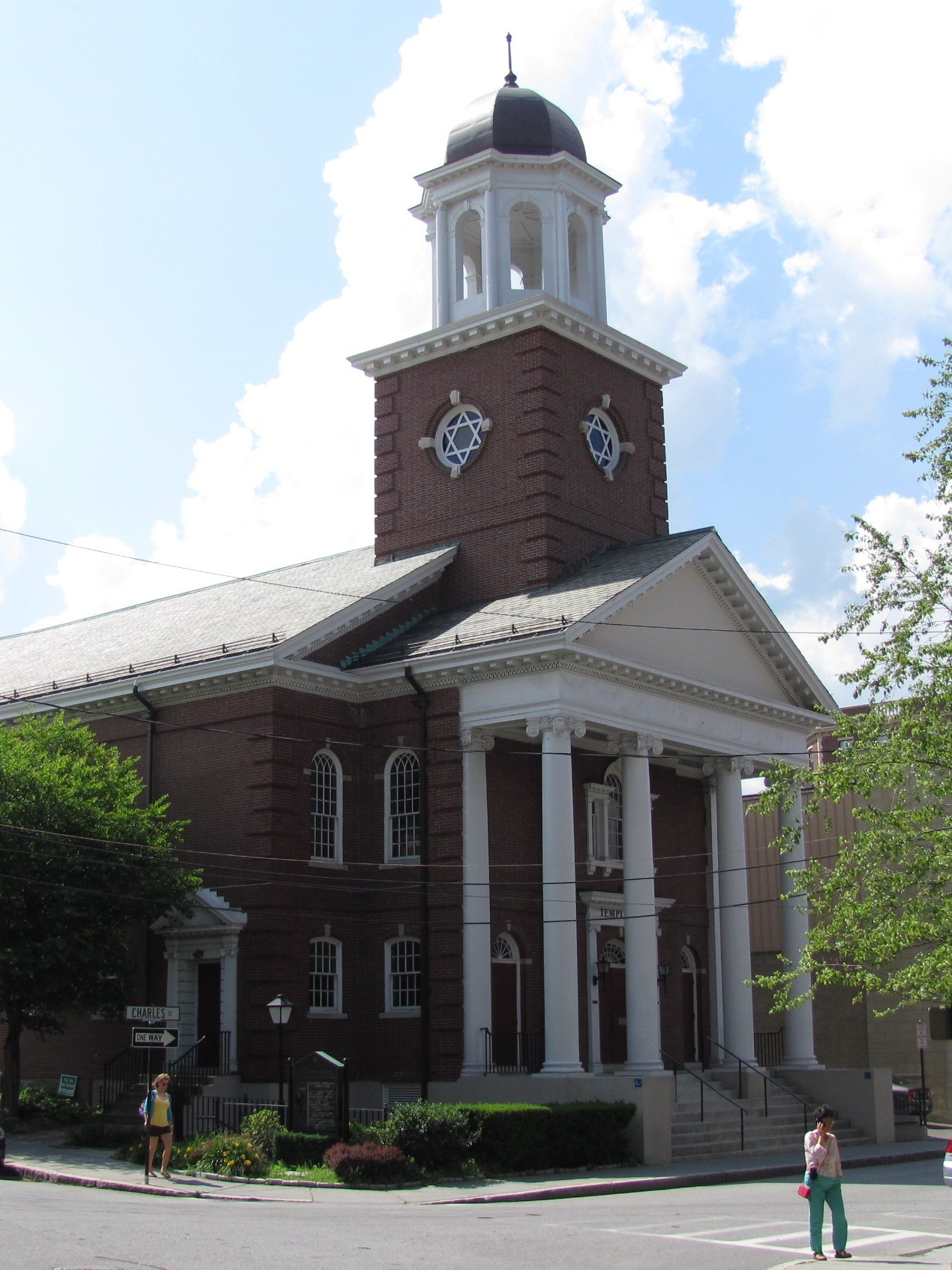
Second Unitarian Church

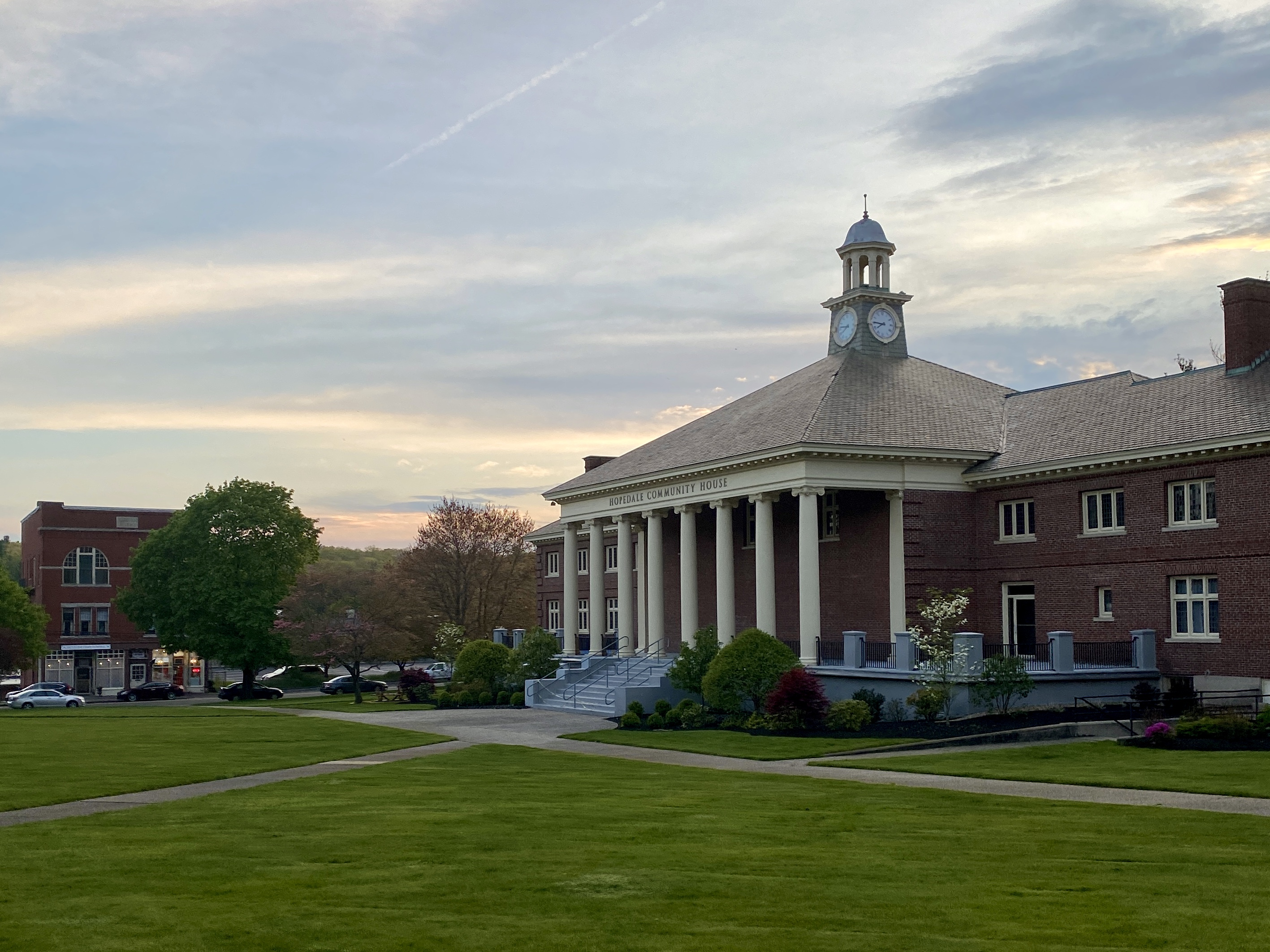
Hopedale Community House
