= Keene Unitarian Universalist Church =

Historic church in New Hampshire, United States

- U.S. National Register of Historic Places
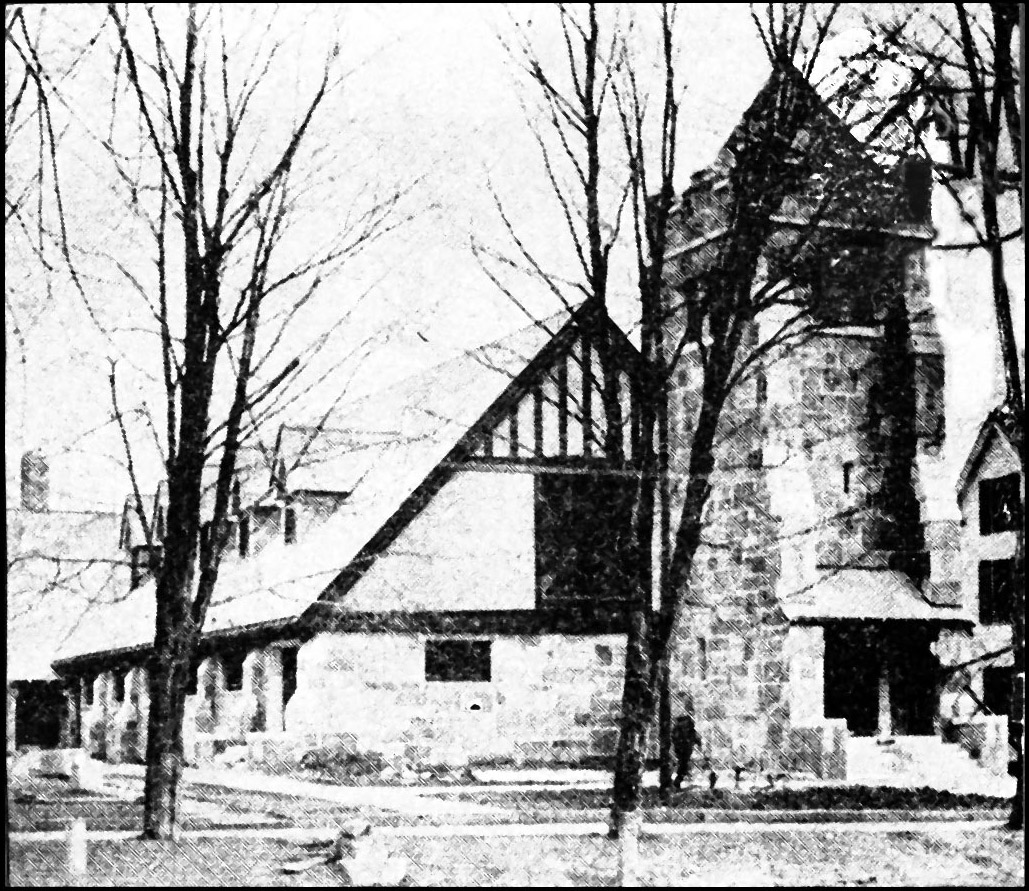

- Location within New Hampshire Location within the United States
- Location: 69 Washington St., Keene, New Hampshire
- Coordinates: 42°56′10″N 72°16′38″W
- Built: 1894
- Architect: Edwin J. Lewis Jr.
- Architectural style: Late Gothic Revival & Tudor Revival
- NRHP reference No.: 100010873
- Added to NRHP: September 27, 2024

The Keene Unitarian Universalist Church is a historic Unitarian Universalist church in Keene, New Hampshire. Constructed in 1894, (Note: This church should not be confused with an earlier Unitarian Church in Keene, which was built in 1829–30, renovated in 1868, and razed on January 29, 1894. Photos of both the earlier Unitarian Church and the extant Unitarian Universalist Church are available at Wikimedia Commons.) it was added to the New Hampshire State Register of Historic Places in 2021, and the National Register of Historic Places in 2024.

== Description ==
Construction on the church and its attached parish hall began in April 1894 and was completed that summer. Both structures were designed by architect Edwin J. Lewis Jr., in Late Gothic Revival and Tudor Revival styles. Features of the church include:

- Granite from Roxbury, New Hampshire
- Pews imported from Paris
- A 1,500-pound (680 kg) bell made by Paul Revere
- A window behind the pulpit, installed in 1900, designed by Frederick Wilson of Tiffany Studios
- A stone plaque by Francis Barrett Faulkner

An educational wing was added in 1960, done in modern style and designed by architect Arthur M. Doyle.

== See also ==
- National Register of Historic Places listings in Cheshire County, New Hampshire
