= Dearborne =

Dearborne is a surname. Notable people with the surname include:

- Bud Dearborne, a fictional character in the True Blood TV-series

== See also ==
- Dearborn (disambiguation)
