= Dearborn School =

- U.S. National Register of Historic Places
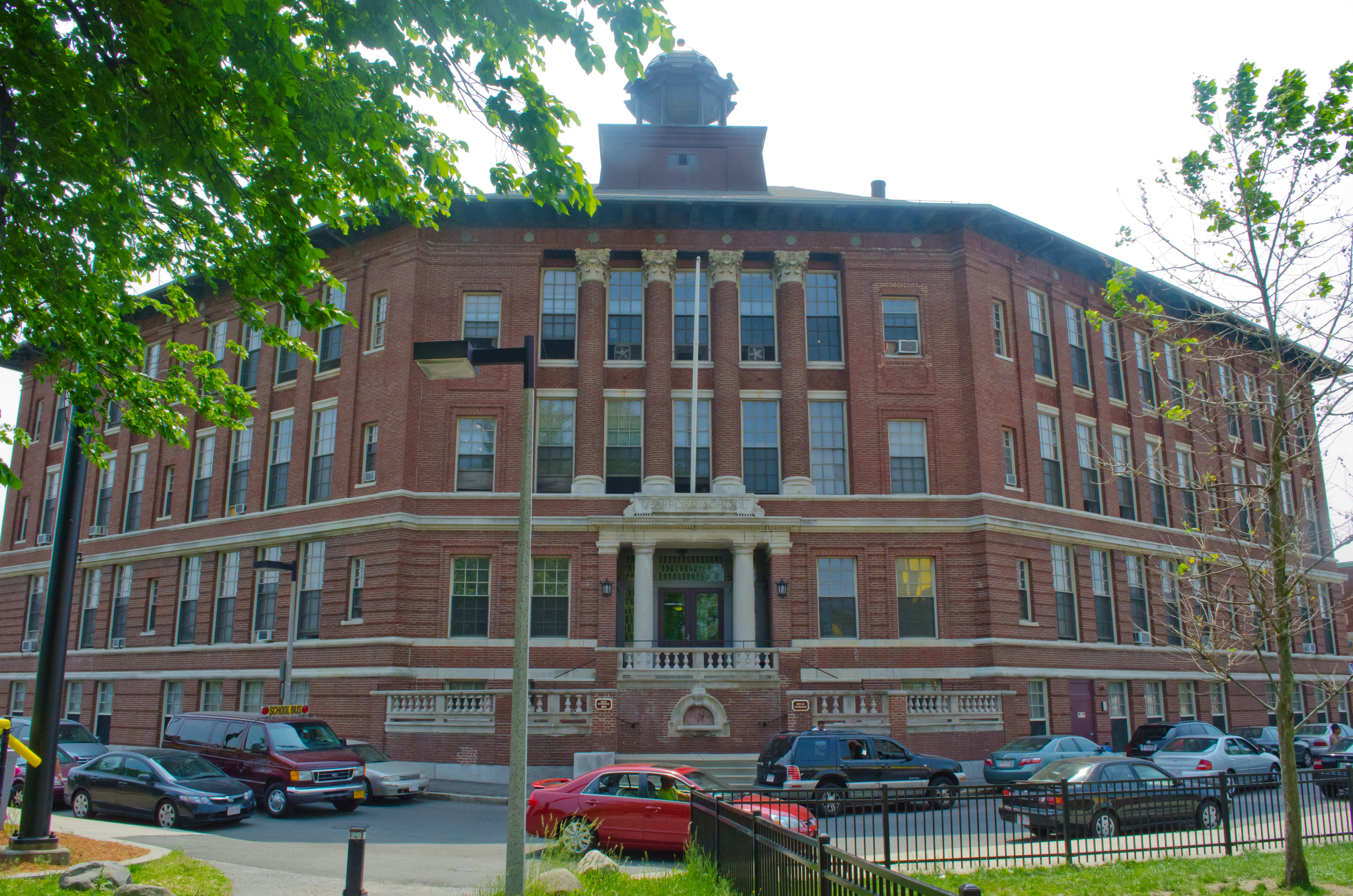

- Location within Massachusetts Location within the United States
- Location: Boston, Massachusetts
- Coordinates: 42°19′47″N 71°04′40″W
- Built: 1905
- Architect: Edwin J. Lewis Jr.
- Architectural style: Beaux Arts
- NRHP reference No.: 00000871
- Added to NRHP: August 2, 2000

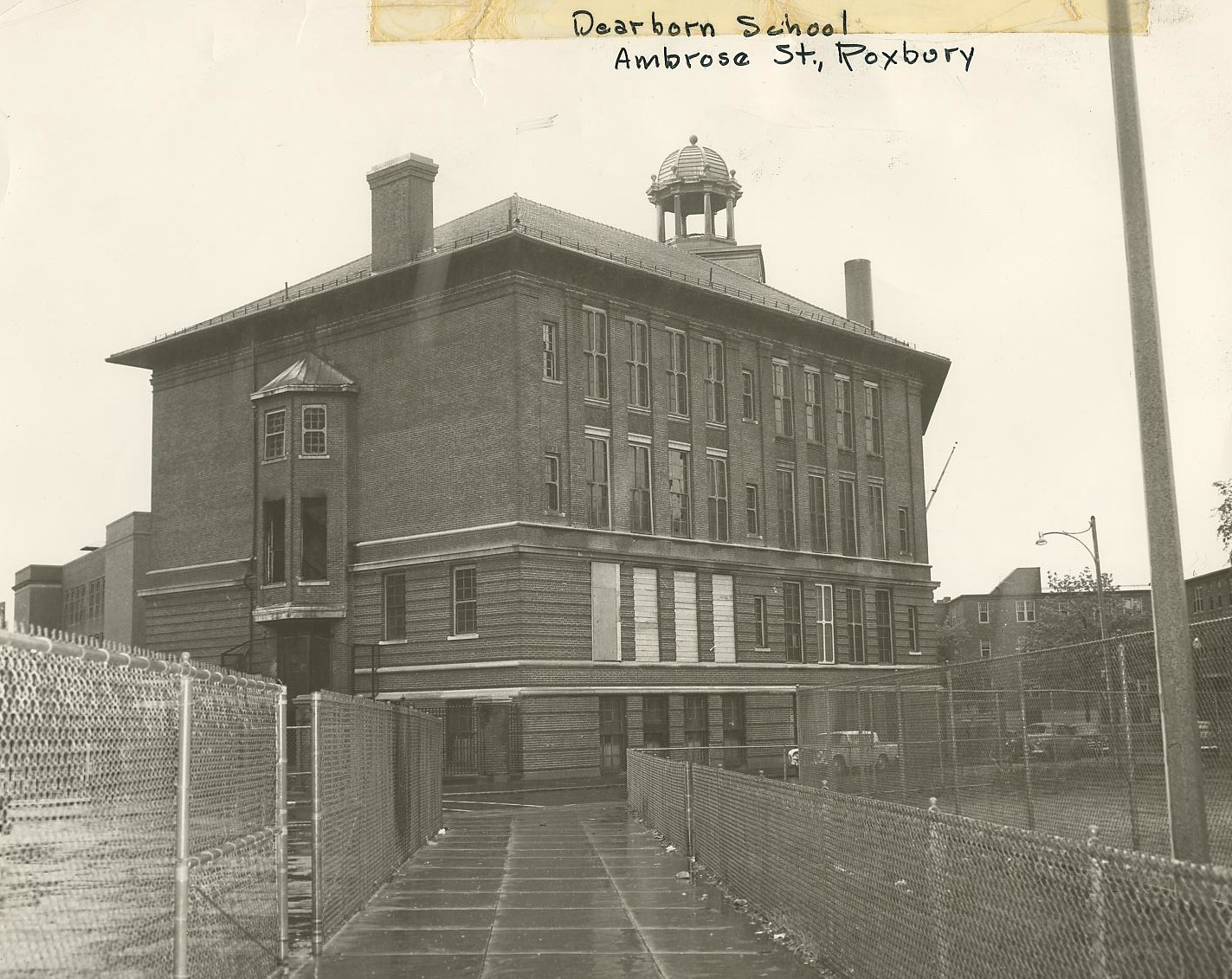
Dearborn School in 1957

The Dearborn School is an historic school building at 25 Ambrose Street in the Roxbury neighborhood of Boston, Massachusetts. The three-story brick Beaux Arts school was designed by Roxbury native Edwin James Lewis Jr., and built in 1905. It is the only building to survive a c. 1950 urban redevelopment of the area. It was named in honor of Boston mayor Henry A. S. Dearborn. It served as an elementary or middle school until the 1980s, and has since been converted into housing.

The building was listed on the National Register of Historic Places in 2000.

== See also ==
- National Register of Historic Places listings in southern Boston, Massachusetts
