= Massachusetts Fields School =

- U.S. National Register of Historic Places
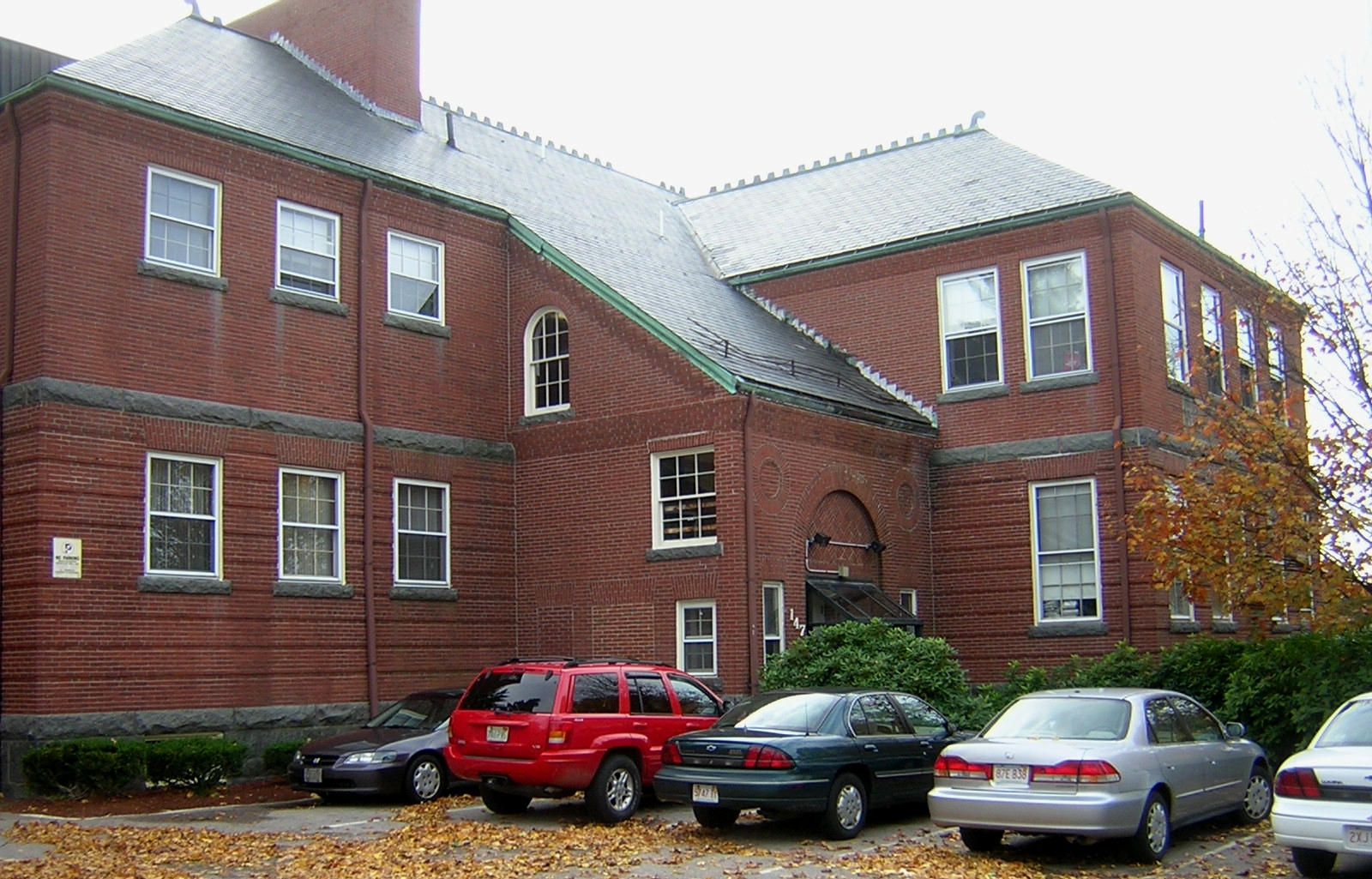

- Location within Massachusetts Location within the United States
- Location: Rawson Rd. and Beach St., Quincy, Massachusetts
- Coordinates: 42°16′20″N 71°00′58″W
- Area: less than one acre
- Built: 1896
- Architect: A. H. Wright; Stephen O. Moxon
- Architectural style: Colonial Revival, Queen Anne
- NRHP reference No.: 88000960
- Added to NRHP: November 13, 1990

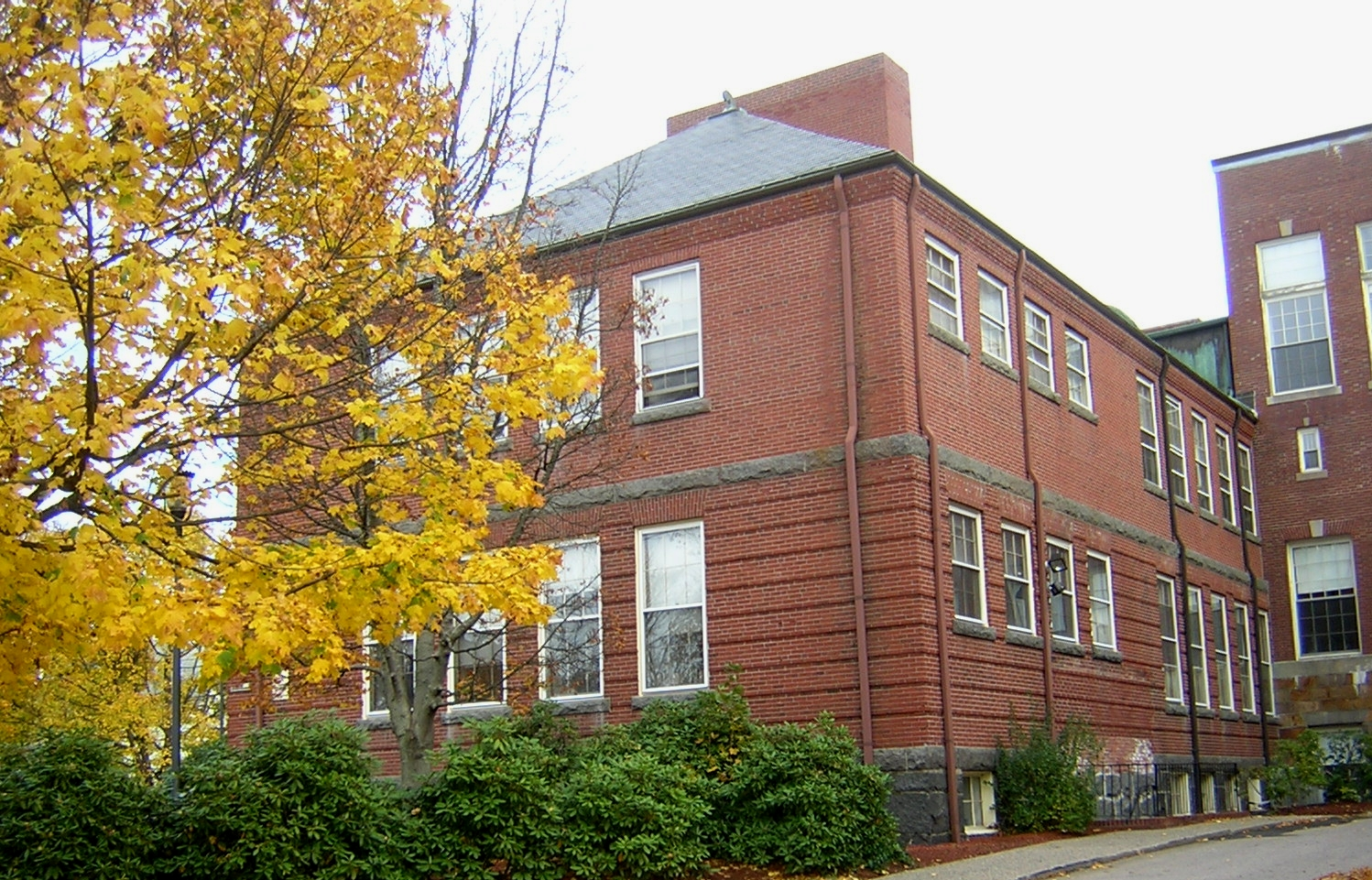

The Massachusetts Fields School is a historic former school building at the corner of Rawson Road and Beach Street in Quincy, Massachusetts. Built in 1896, it is a high-quality Colonial Revival brick building, built during Quincy's revolutionary transformation of its school system in the late 19th century. The school was closed in 1982 and was renovated into apartments. It was listed on the National Register of Historic Places in 1990.

== Description and history ==
The former Massachusetts Fields School building occupies the length of a city block on the south side of Rawson Road, bounded on the west by Willet Street and on the east by Beach Street, in the city's Wollaston neighborhood. It is a two-story brick structure with granite trim, set on a high granite foundation, with a hip roof. A granite water table separates the foundation from the first floor, and a similar stringcourse separates the two floors. Windows are set in openings with granite sills and brick lintels. The original part of the building is T-shaped with a projecting central pavilion that is flanked by lower entry porches. A large addition, built in 1923-24, stands to the rear of the original block.

Following the publication in 1873 of a blistering report on the poor quality of the city's district schools, Quincy embarked on a program of improvement that included the construction of new, more centralized, graded school buildings. Between 1892 and 1900 four new school buildings were built, including this one, which was completed in 1896. It was designed by Arthur W. Wright, possibly in conjunction with the builder, Stephen O. Moxon, and is similar in plan to two of the other schools built, the Gridley Bryant School and the Cranch School. The building was named for the broad plain between Mount Wollaston and the Neponset River. It was enlarged in 1923-24 due to increased enrollment, using similar materials, but with more Colonial Revival styling than the original. The school was closed in 1982, and has been converted into residences.

== See also ==
- National Register of Historic Places listings in Quincy, Massachusetts
