= Cranch School =

- U.S. National Register of Historic Places
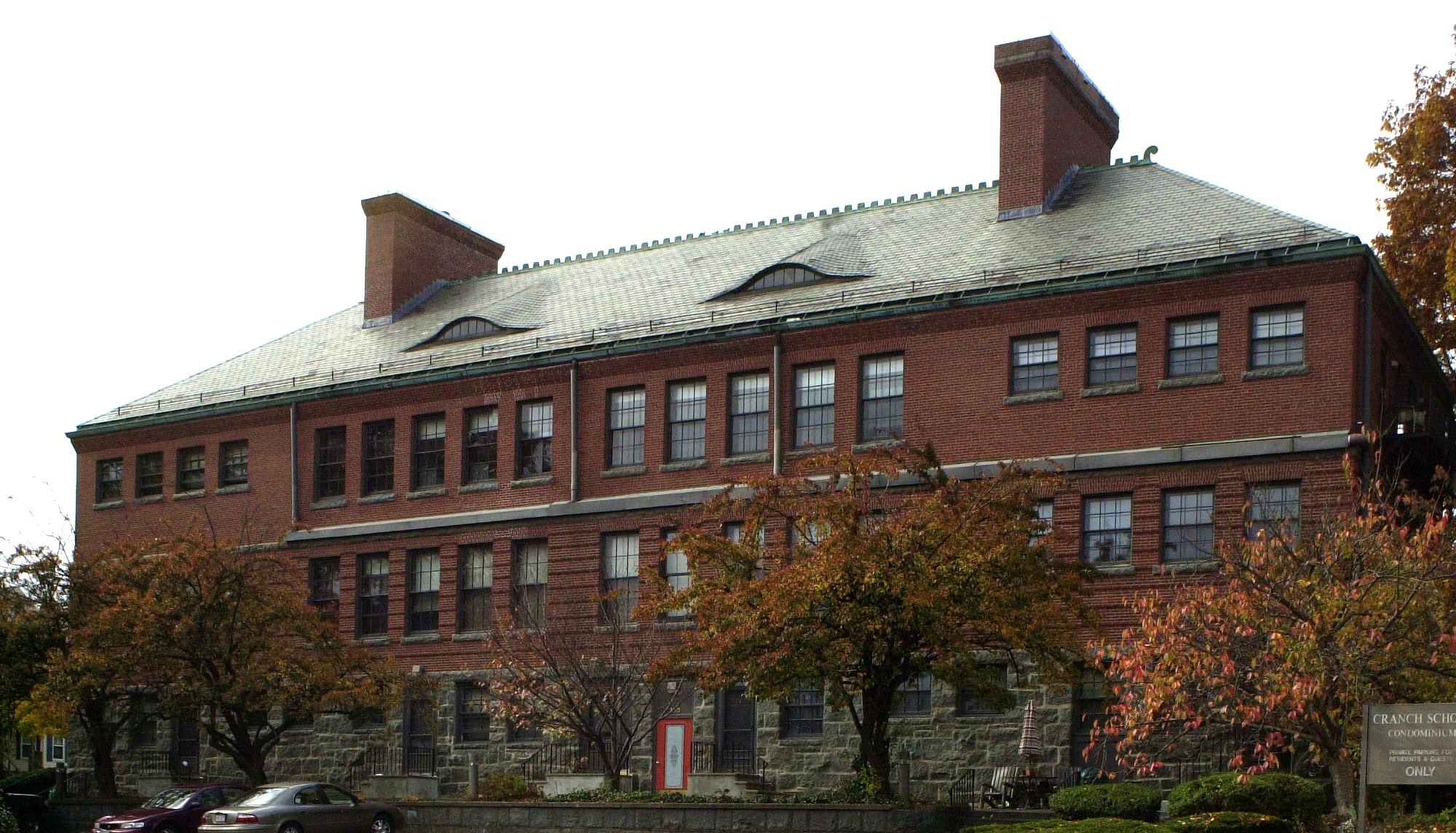

- Location within Massachusetts Location within the United States
- Location: 270 Whitwell St., Quincy, Massachusetts
- Coordinates: 42°14′57″N 71°0′32″W
- Area: 1.4 acres (0.57 ha)
- Built: 1900
- Architect: Wright, Albert H.
- Architectural style: Renaissance
- NRHP reference No.: 84002872
- Added to NRHP: July 05, 1984

The Cranch School is a historic school building at 250 Whitwell Street in Quincy, Massachusetts. Built in 1900 to a design by local architect Arthur Wright, it is a high-quality local example of Renaissance Revival and Queen Anne architecture. The building was listed on the National Register of Historic Places in 1984. It was converted to a condominium building in the 1980s.

== Description and history ==
The former Cranch School occupies a roughly triangular lot in a residential area of central Quincy, bounded on the south by Whitwell Street, the north by Glendale Road, and the west by Maywood Avenue. It is a two-story brick building, rectangular in layout with a projecting central pavilion on the main (west-facing) facade. The two main floors are separated by a granite belt course, and there is a band of corbelled brickwork at the eave below the slate hip roof. The projecting section, two stories with sash windows, is flanked by single-story shed-roofed entrance pavilions, with the entrances recessed under round-arch openings that have a basket-weave brick pattern in the arched section. The side elevations have four sash windows at each level, and the rear has 18 bays, roughly grouped in four and five sets of windows.

The building was designed by Arthur Wright, and built in 1900, a period of significant growth in the city. It was named for Richard Cranch (1726-1811), a prominent local politician who once owned the land on which the school is located. The building was converted to residential use in the 1980s.

== Gallery ==
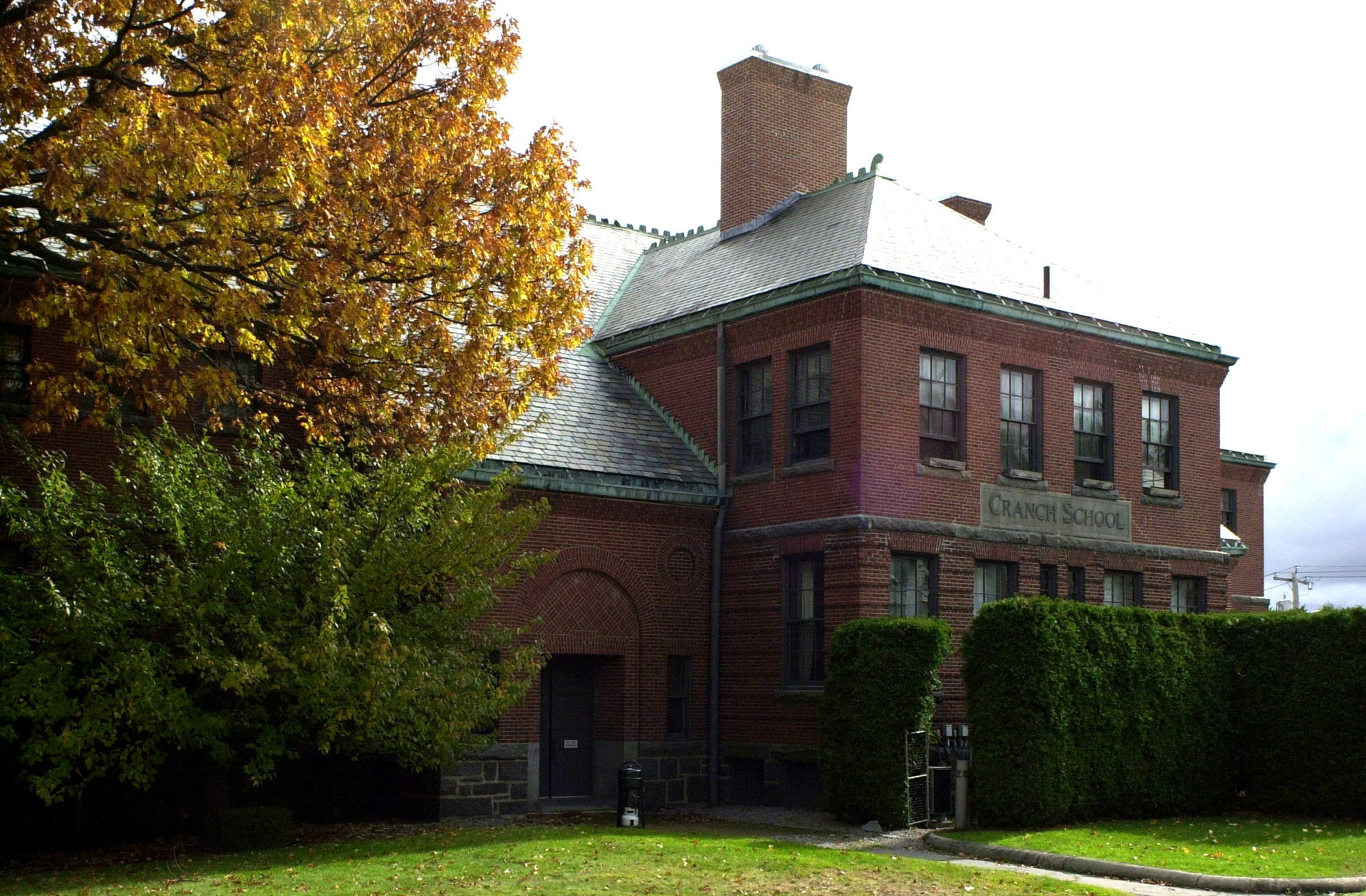

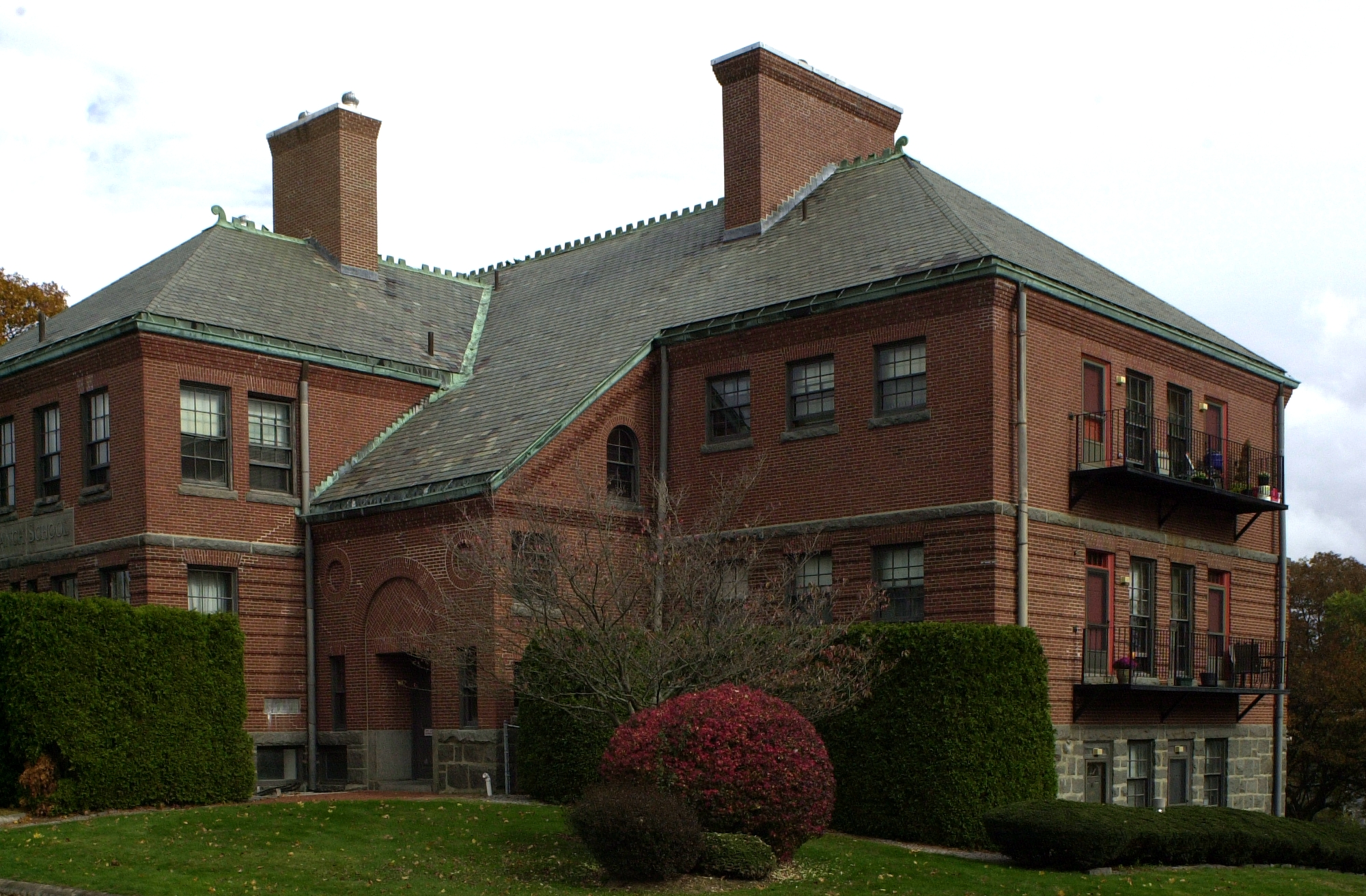

== See also ==
- National Register of Historic Places listings in Quincy, Massachusetts
