= Charles H. Burgess House =

Historic house in Massachusetts, United States

- U.S. National Register of Historic Places
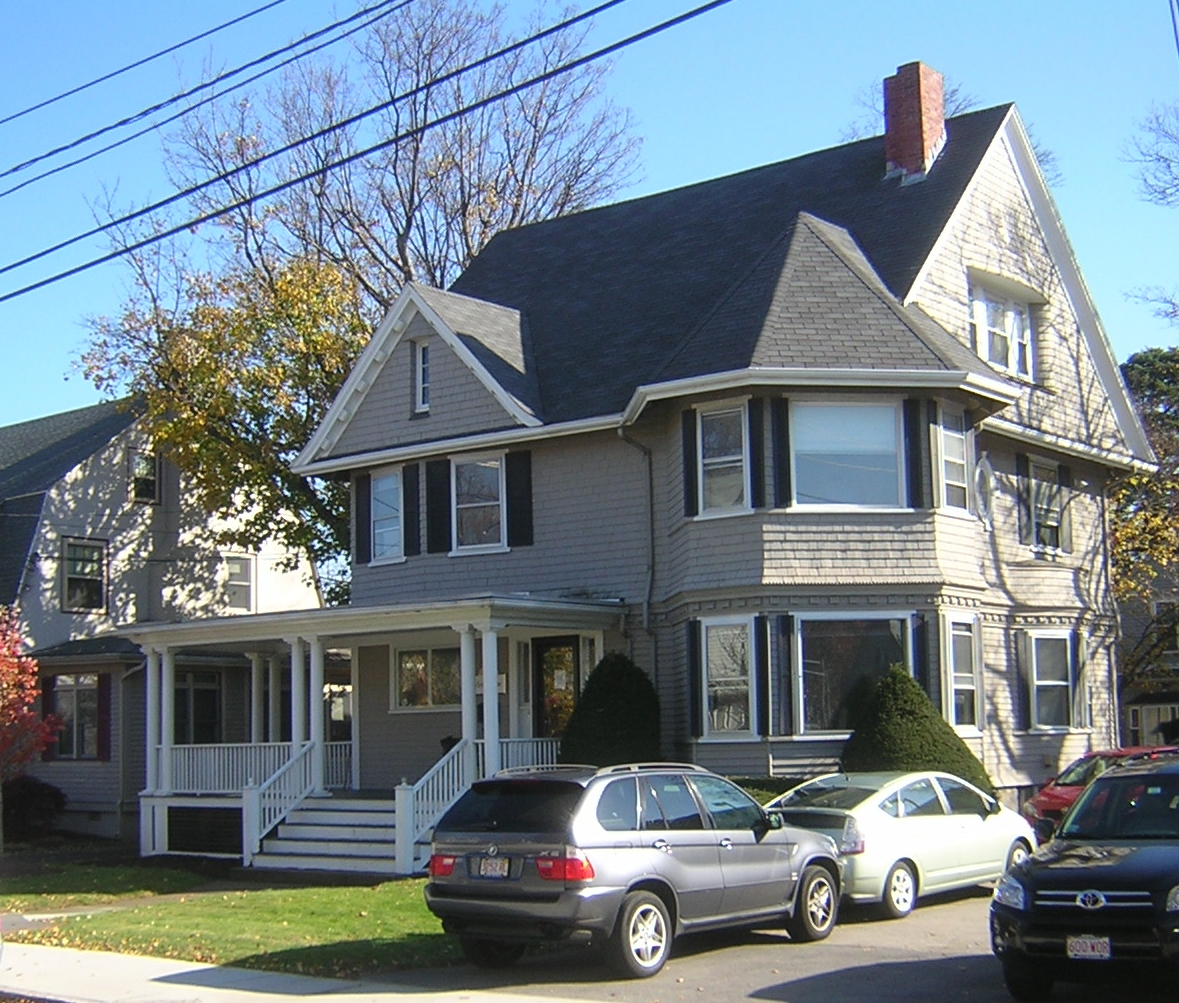

- Location within Massachusetts Location within the United States
- Location: 17 Whitney Rd., Quincy, Massachusetts
- Coordinates: 42°15′14.4″N 71°0′16″W
- Area: 0.2 acres (0.081 ha)
- Built: 1903
- Architectural style: Shingle Style
- MPS: Quincy MRA
- NRHP reference No.: 89001381
- Added to NRHP: September 20, 1989

The Charles H. Burgess House is a historic house at 17 Whitney Road in Quincy, Massachusetts. The 2 1/2-story wood-frame house was built c. 1903 by Charles H. Burgess, a real estate developer and auction-house owner. The house exhibits both Queen Anne and Shingle styling, with Queen Anne-like projecting corner bay, and a wraparound porch supported by paired columns. Decorative cut shingles make a string course under a slight flare at the base of the second floor.

The house was listed on the National Register of Historic Places in 1989.

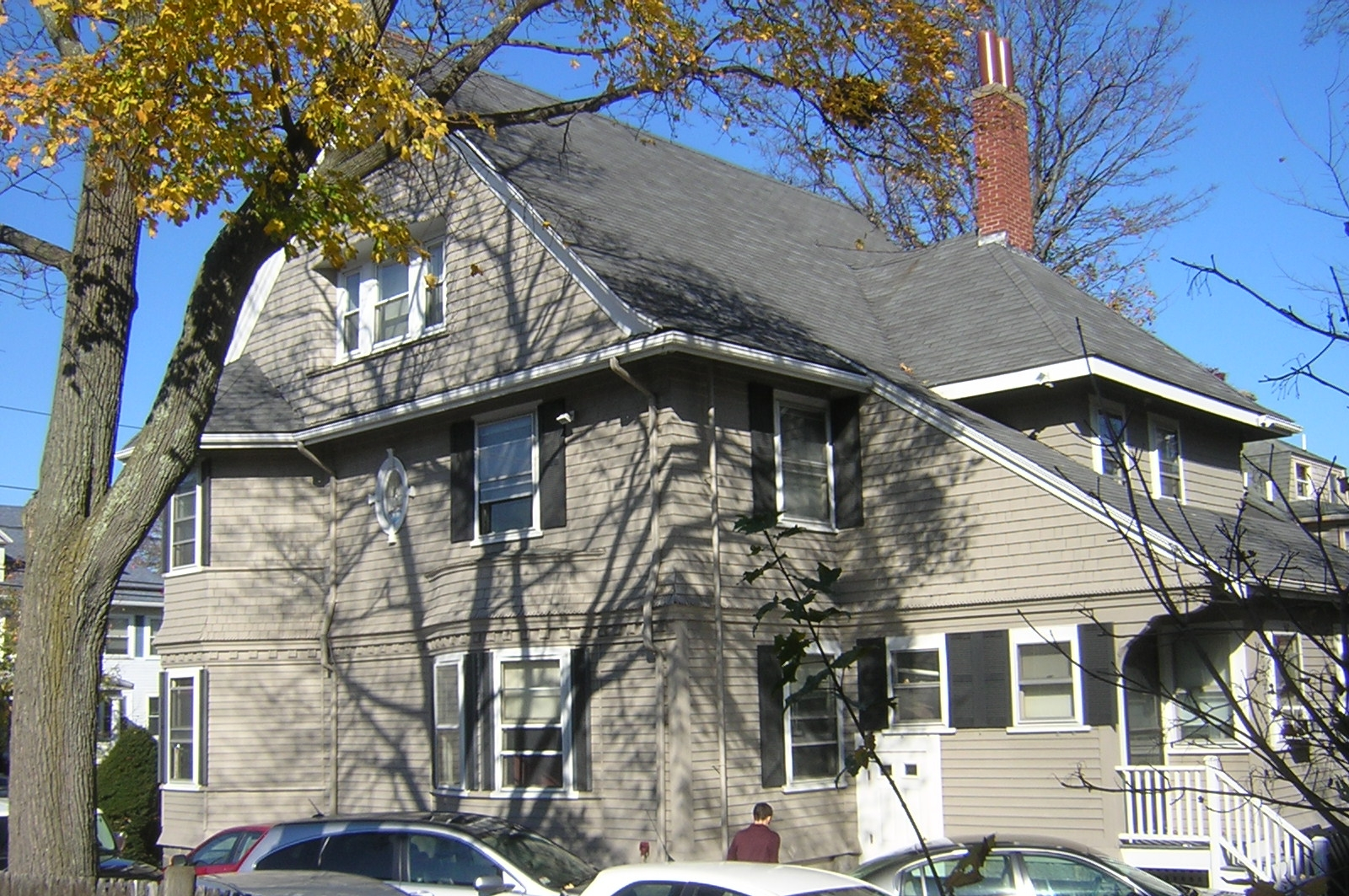

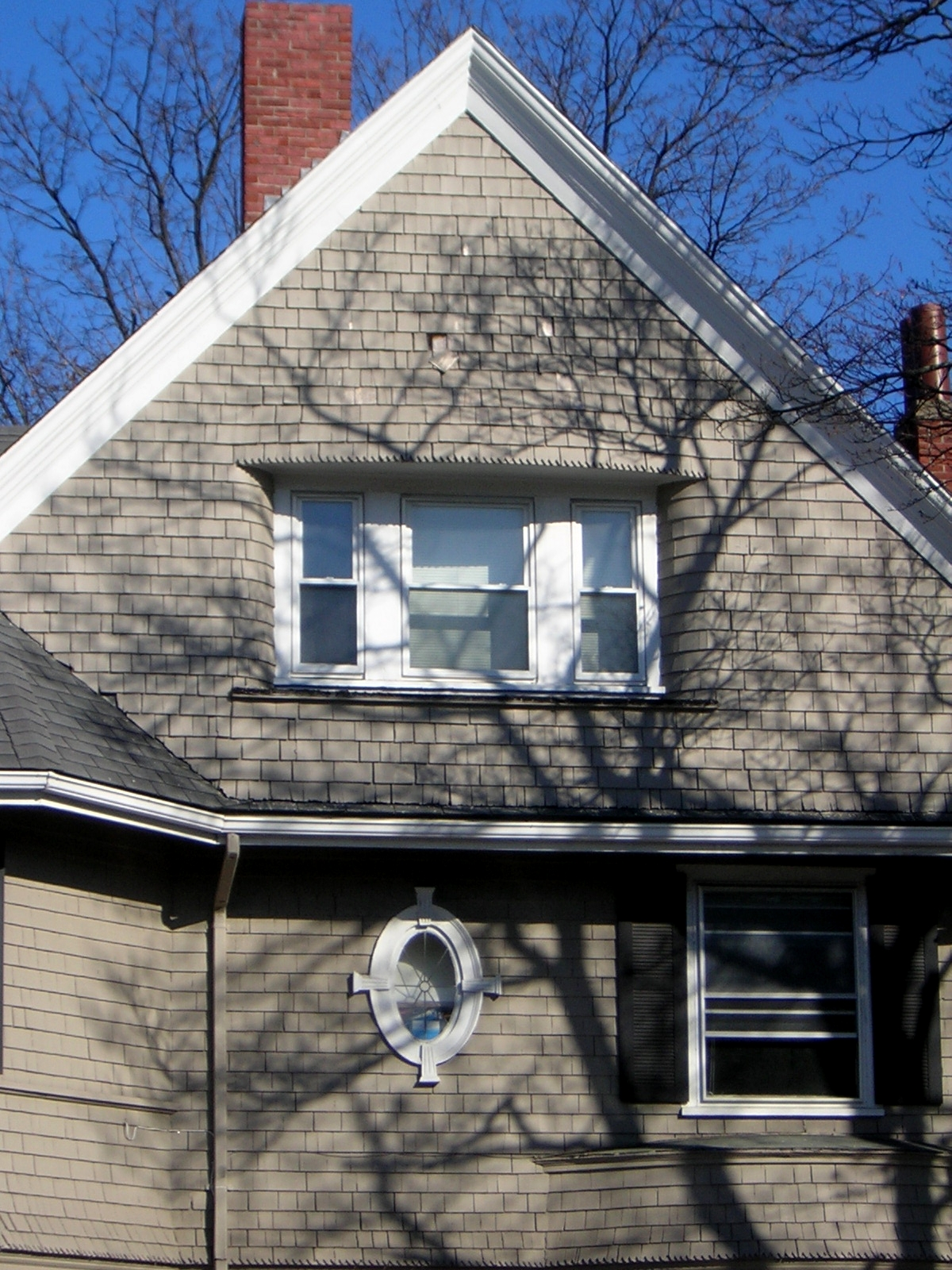

== See also ==
- National Register of Historic Places listings in Quincy, Massachusetts
