= Frank Burgess House =

Historic house in Massachusetts, United States

- U.S. National Register of Historic Places
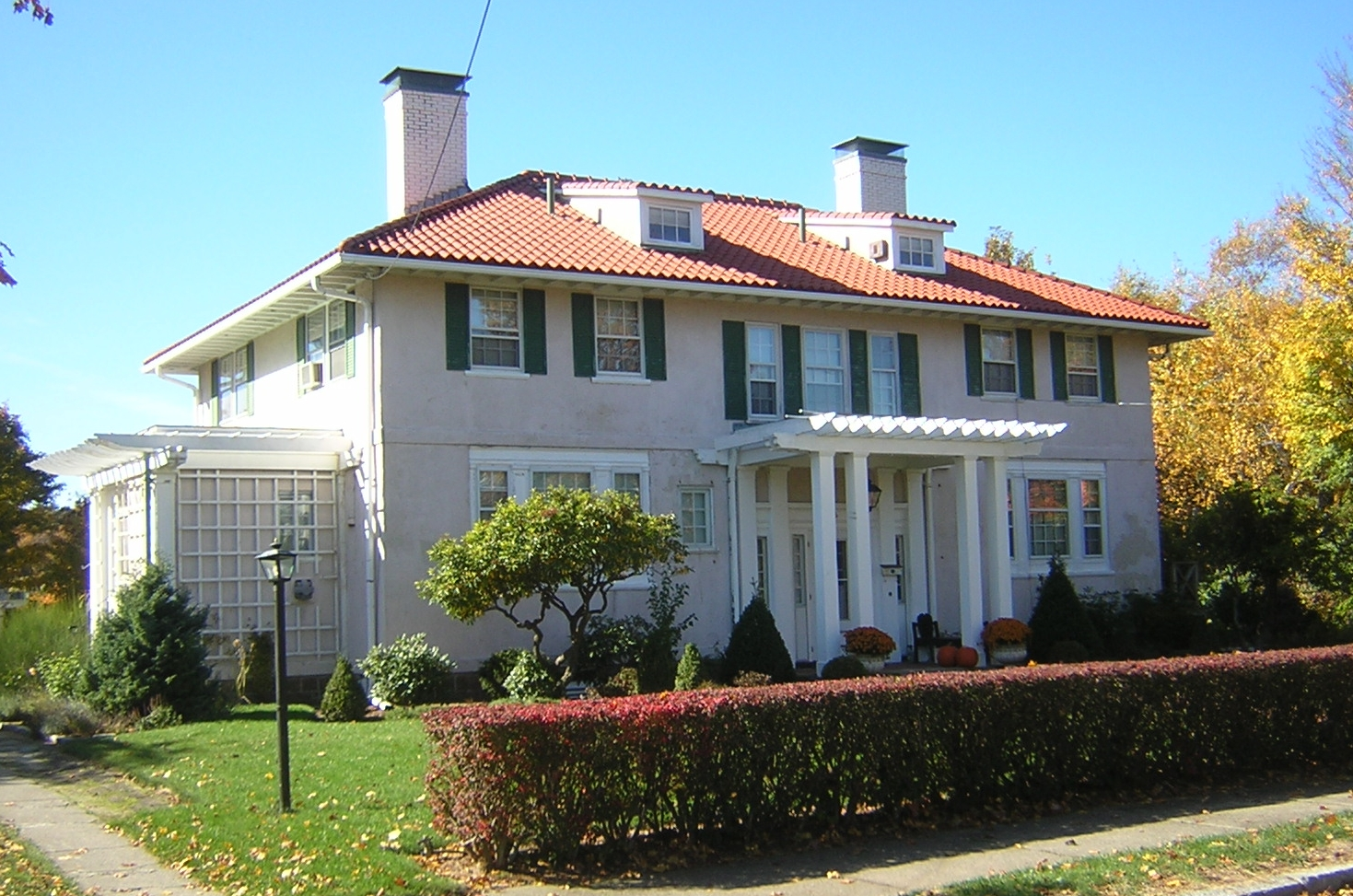

- Location within Massachusetts Location within the United States
- Location: 355 Highland Ave., Quincy, Massachusetts
- Coordinates: 42°15′37″N 71°1′17″W
- Built: 1913
- Architect: Cleveland & Godfrey
- Architectural style: Prairie School, Bungalow/Craftsman
- MPS: Quincy MRA
- NRHP reference No.: 89001354
- Added to NRHP: September 20, 1989

The Frank Burgess House is a historic house at 355 Highland Avenue in Quincy, Massachusetts.

It was built in 1913 for Frank Burgess, the owner of Boston Gear Works, who paid $14,000 for it. It was one of the first commissions of Cleveland and Godfrey, who went on to build at least two schools in Quincy.

It is in a style known locally as "Prairie Bungalow", with elements of both the California Bungalow Style and the middle-west Prairie Style. It is unusual locally for its red tile roof, stucco exterior finish, and the Craftsman style portico with open rafters with shaped ends.

The house was listed on the National Register of Historic Places in 1989.

== See also ==
- National Register of Historic Places listings in Quincy, Massachusetts
