= Frank W. Crane House =

Historic house in Massachusetts, United States

- U.S. National Register of Historic Places
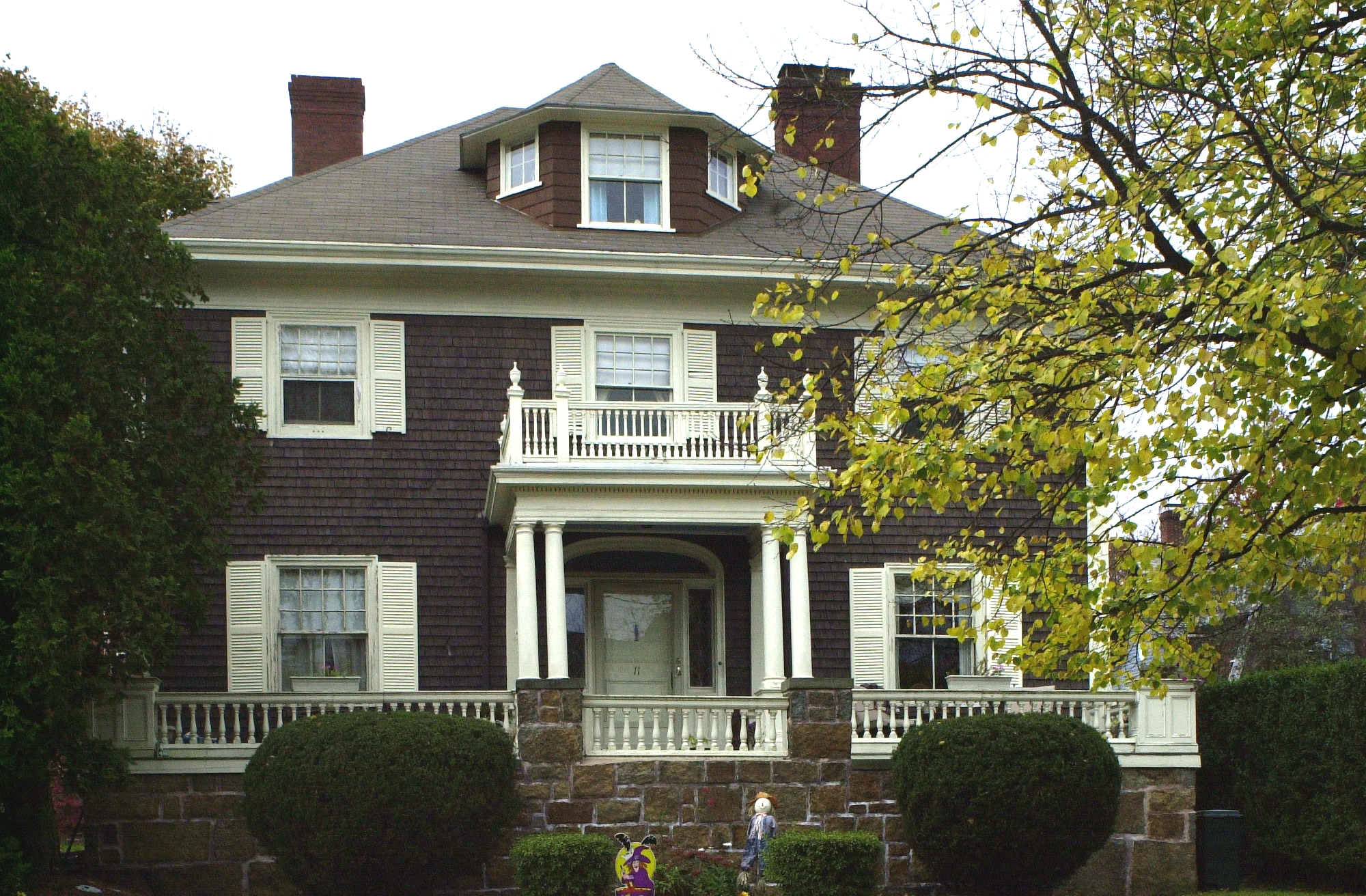

- Location within Massachusetts Location within the United States
- Location: 11 Avon Way, Quincy, Massachusetts
- Coordinates: 42°15′2.6″N 71°0′27.9″W
- Area: 0.3 acres (0.12 ha)
- Built: 1902
- Architectural style: Colonial Revival
- MPS: Quincy MRA
- NRHP reference No.: 89001312
- Added to NRHP: September 20, 1989

The Frank W. Crane House is a historic house at 11 Avon Way in Quincy, Massachusetts, United States. The 2 1/2-story wood-frame house was built c. 1902, on President's Hill, an affluent residential development made on land formerly part of the Adams family estate. It is a graceful Colonial Revival house, with a symmetrical three-bay facade. The front entry is sheltered by a portico, supported by doubled Doric columns, and is topped by a low balcony with urn-shaped balusters.

The house was listed on the National Register of Historic Places in 1989.

== See also ==
- National Register of Historic Places listings in Quincy, Massachusetts
