= House at 105 President's Lane =

Historic house in Massachusetts, United States

- U.S. National Register of Historic Places
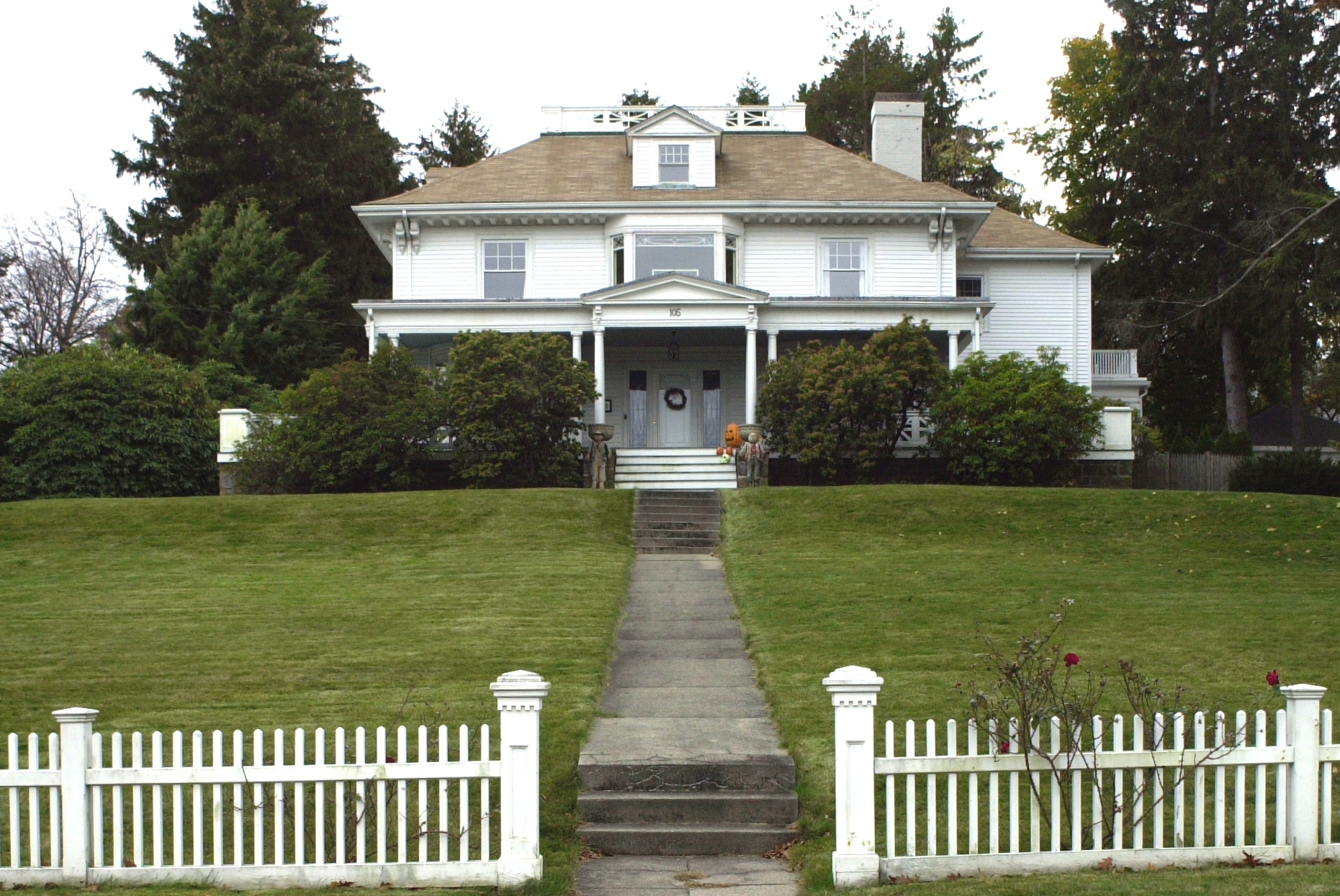

- Location within Massachusetts Location within the United States
- Location: 105 President's Ln., Quincy, Massachusetts
- Coordinates: 42°15′10″N 71°0′29″W
- Area: 0.6 acres (0.24 ha)
- Built: 1915
- Architectural style: Colonial Revival
- MPS: Quincy MRA
- NRHP reference No.: 89001365
- Added to NRHP: September 20, 1989

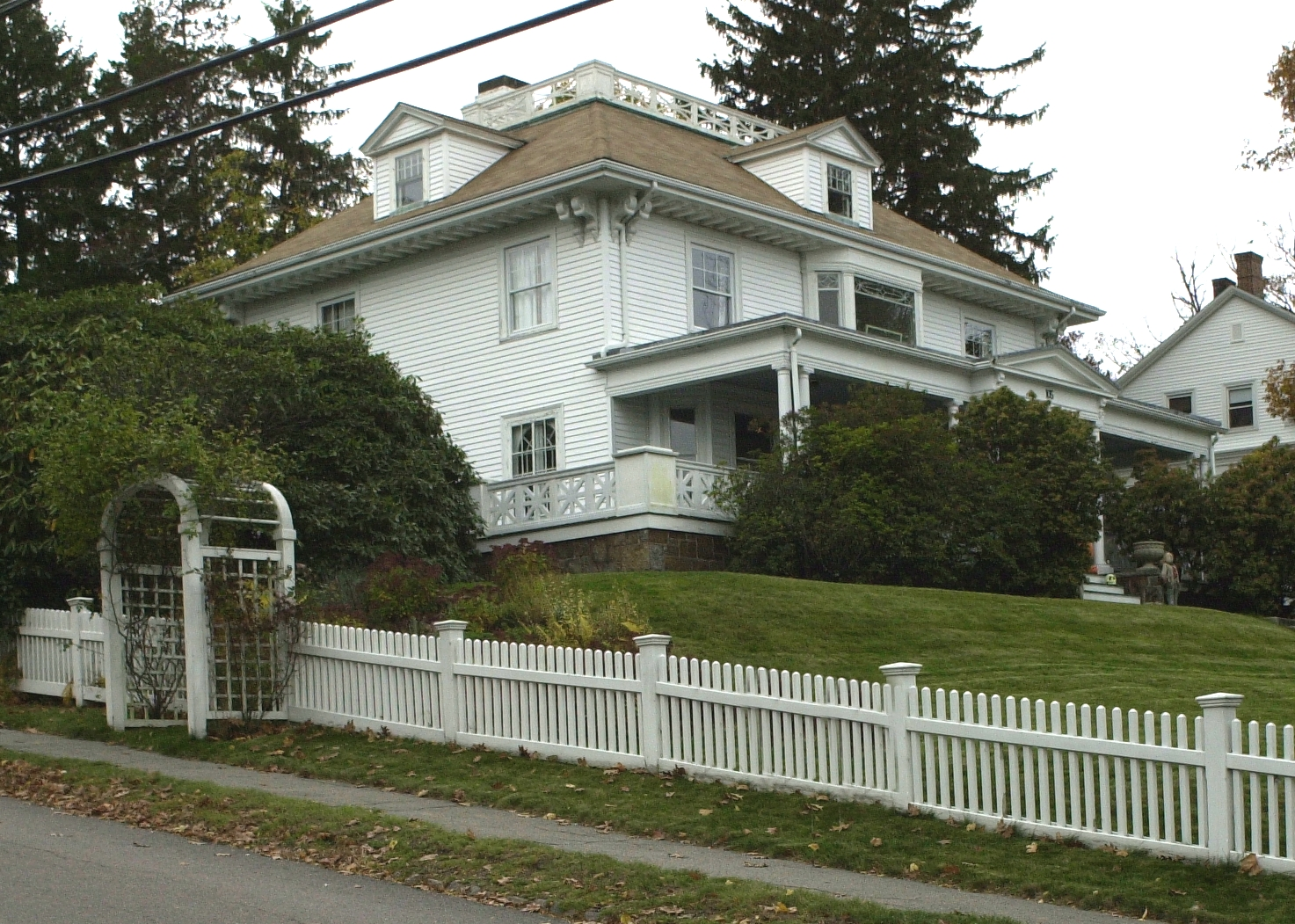

The House at 105 President's Lane in Quincy, Massachusetts, is the best-preserved and least-altered house of its style in the city. It is a two-story hip-roofed Colonial Revival house, with a balustrade on the roof, pedimented gable dormers, and an elliptical fanlight in the central bay window on the second floor. It was built about 1915 by Morton Swallow, about whom nothing is known. The President's Hill area originally belonged to the Adams political family.

The house was listed on the National Register of Historic Places in 1989.

== See also ==
- National Register of Historic Places listings in Quincy, Massachusetts
