= House at 94 Grandview Avenue =

Historic house in Massachusetts, United States

- U.S. National Register of Historic Places
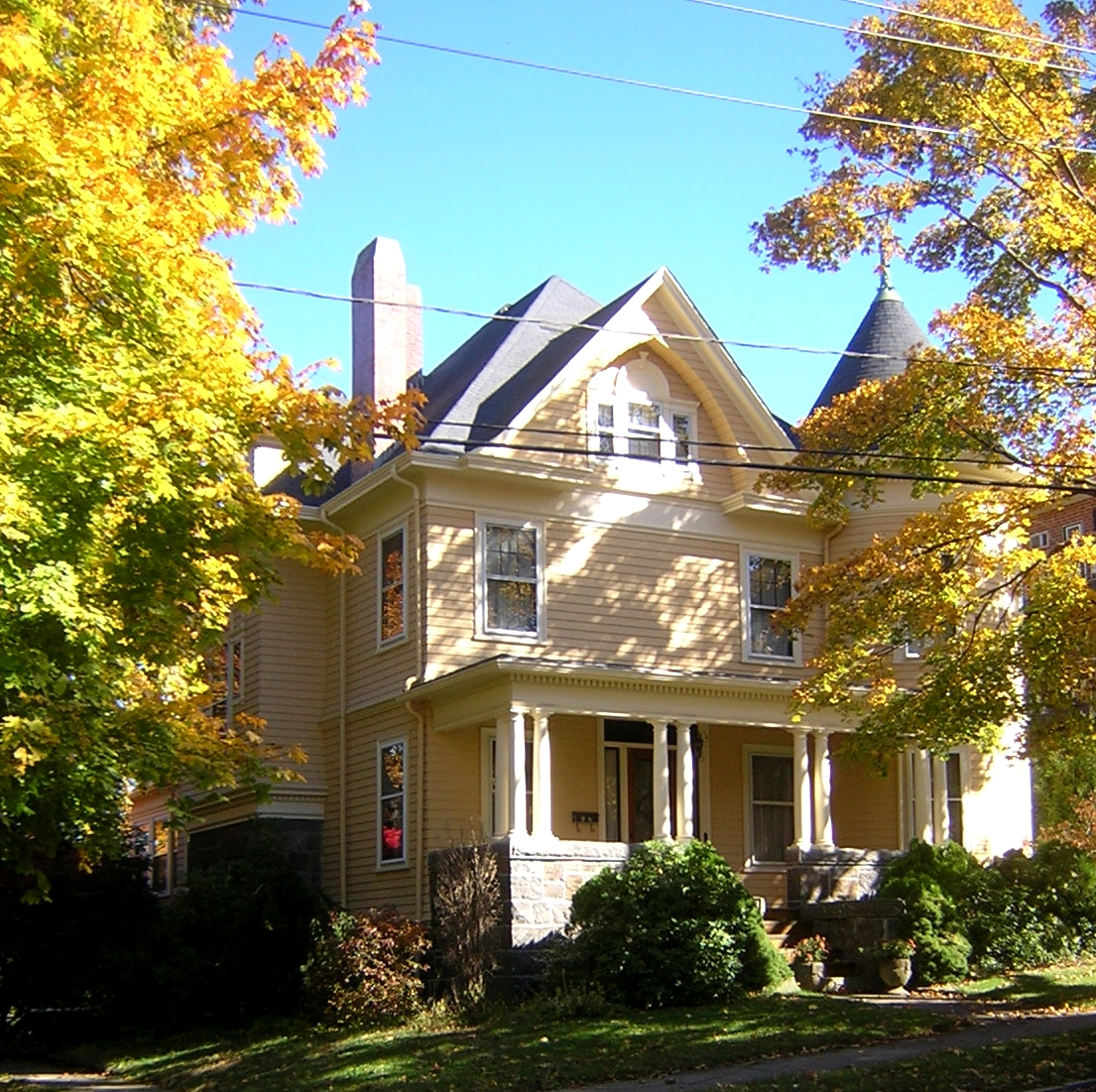

- Location within Massachusetts Location within the United States
- Location: 94 Grandview Ave., Quincy, Massachusetts
- Coordinates: 42°15′45″N 71°1′6″W
- Built: 1890
- Architectural style: Queen Anne
- MPS: Quincy MRA
- NRHP reference No.: 89001339
- Added to NRHP: September 20, 1989

The House at 94 Grandview Avenue in Quincy, Massachusetts, is the best-preserved of a series of Queen Anne Victorians built on Wollaston Hill. The 2 1/2-story wood-frame house was built in the 1890s, probably by Horace Briggs, a Boston businessman. It has the complex massing and turret with conical roof that characterize the style. A porch extends across the front, supported by grouped columns and set on a low stone balustrade, and there is a Palladian window in the gable above.

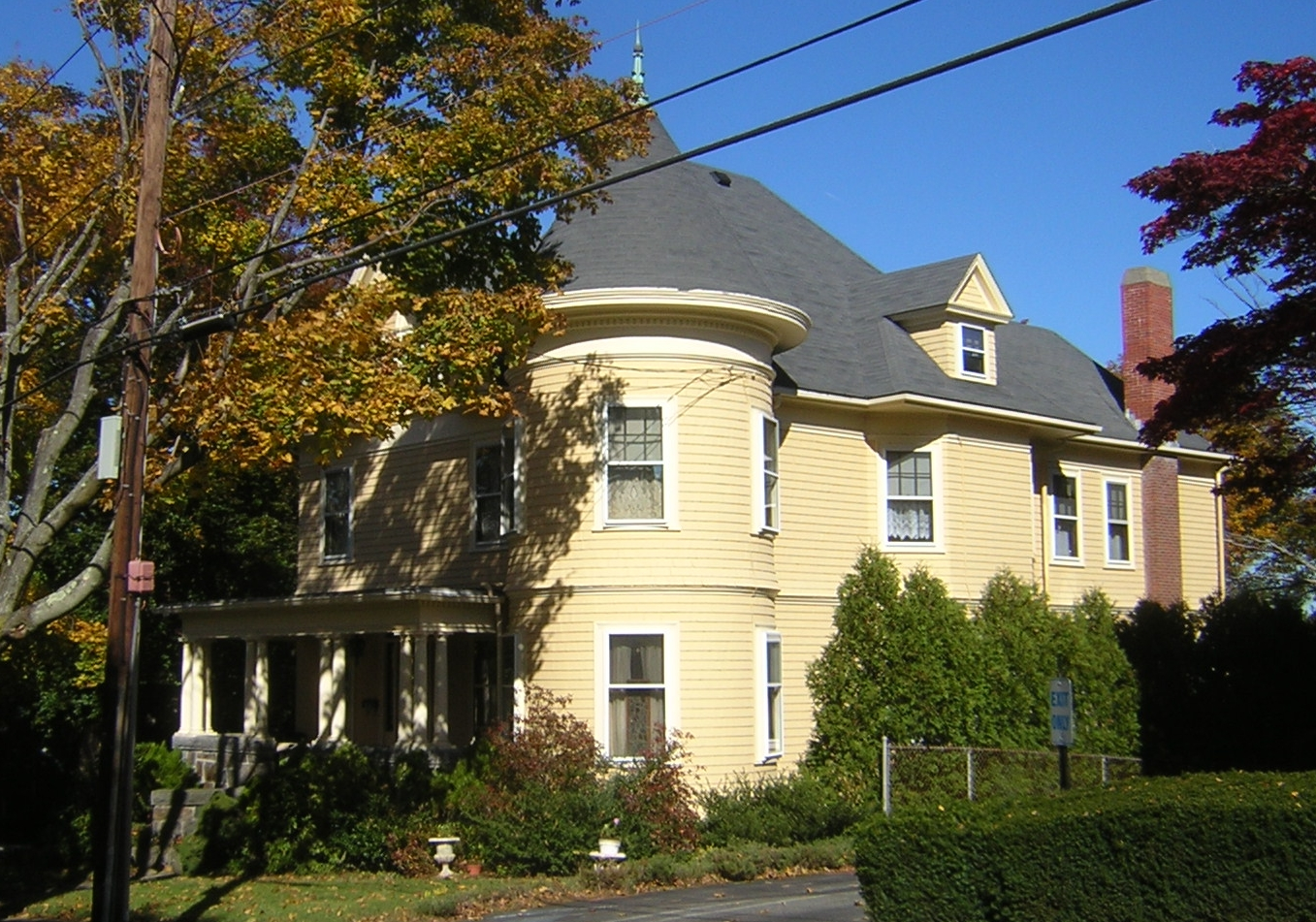

The house was listed on the National Register of Historic Places in 1989.

== See also ==
- National Register of Historic Places listings in Quincy, Massachusetts
