= Edwin W. Marsh House =

Historic house in Massachusetts, United States

- U.S. National Register of Historic Places
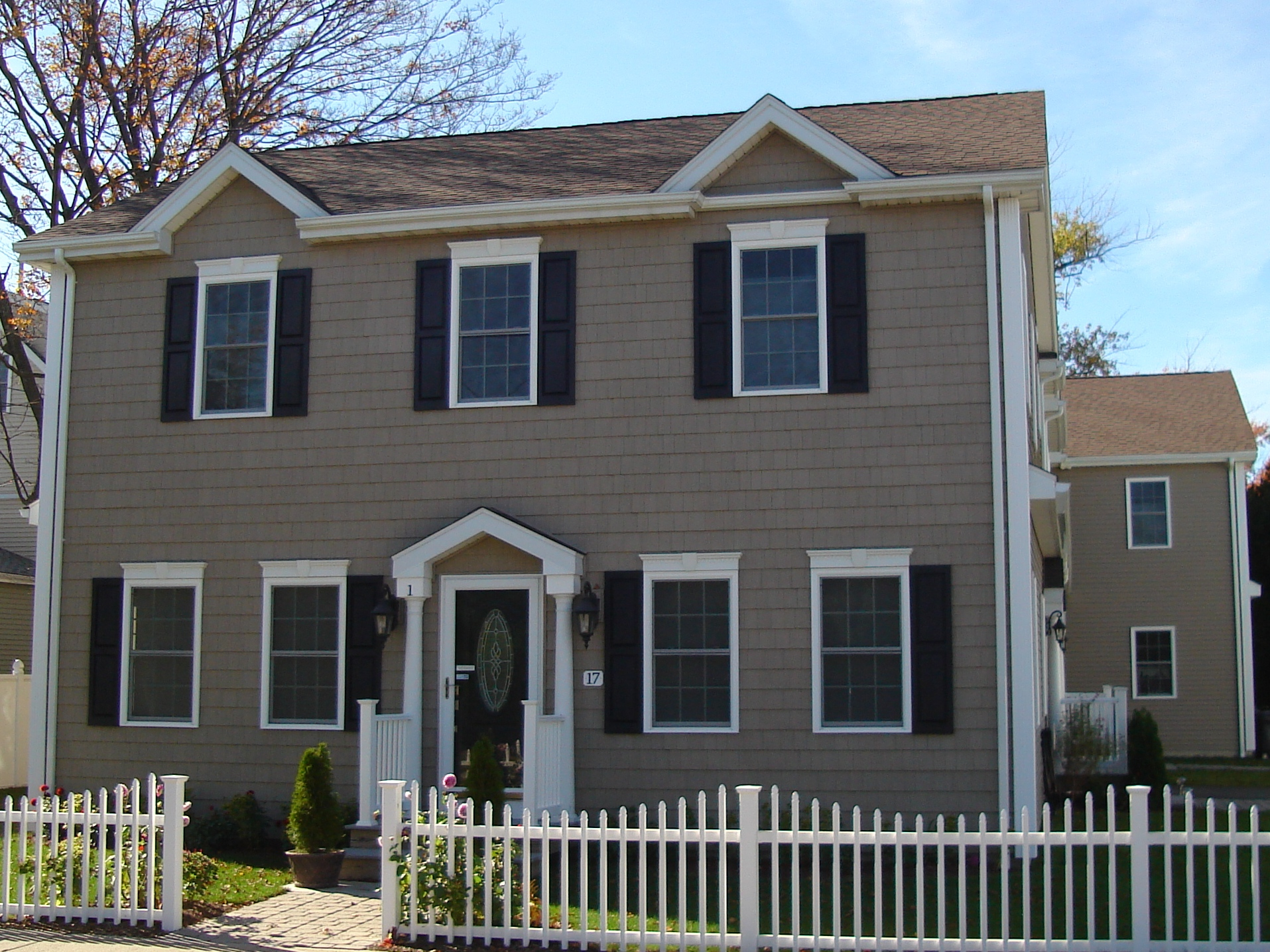
- Photo of the property in 2009

- Location within Massachusetts Location within the United States
- Location: 17 Marsh St., Quincy, Massachusetts
- Coordinates: 42°14′35″N 71°0′22″W
- Built: 1851
- Architectural style: Greek Revival
- MPS: Quincy MRA
- NRHP reference No.: 89001356
- Added to NRHP: September 20, 1989

The Edwin W. Marsh House is (or was) a historic house at 17 Marsh Street in Quincy, Massachusetts. The 1 1/2-story five-bay wood-frame house was built c. 1851, and had a rear ell. The Cape style cottage had vernacular Greek Revival styling, including corner pilasters. It had a bracketed entry portico that was probably added during the Italianate period (1860s-70s).

The house was listed on the National Register of Historic Places in 1989. The lot is now occupied by a multiunit townhouse (pictured).

== See also ==
- National Register of Historic Places listings in Quincy, Massachusetts
