= Thomas Boylston Adams =

Thomas Boylston Adams may refer to:

- Thomas Boylston Adams (1772–1832), Massachusetts legislator and judge and brother of John Quincy Adams
- Thomas Boylston Adams (1910–1997), Massachusetts executive, writer, and political candidate
