= Brooks Adams =

American historian and political scientist (1848–1927)

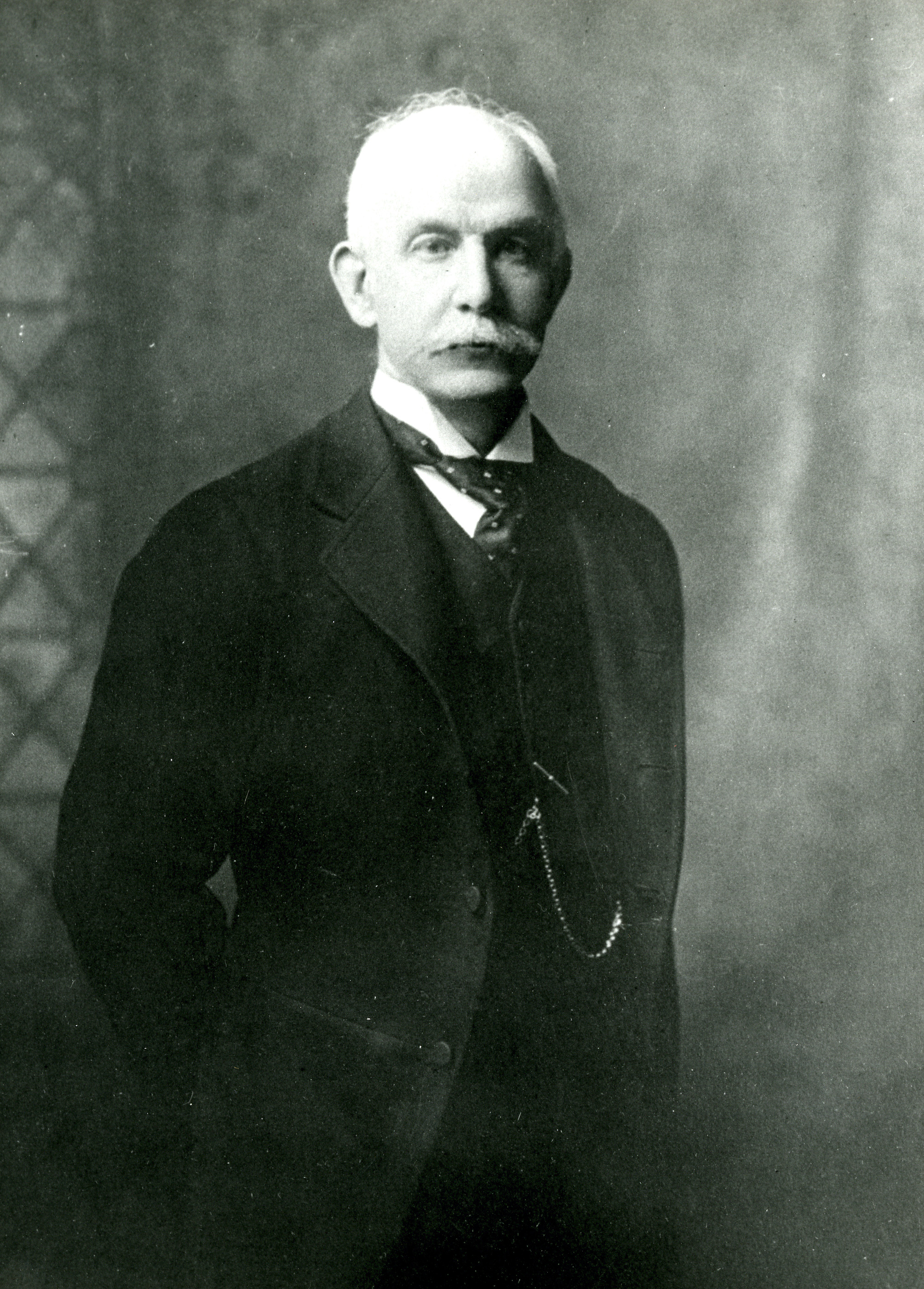
- Adams, photographed in 1910
- Born: Peter Chardon Brooks Adams; June 24, 1848; Quincy, Massachusetts, U.S.
- Died: February 13, 1927 (aged 78); Boston, Massachusetts, U.S.
- Education: Harvard University
- Occupation: Historian
- Spouse: Evelyn Davis
- Parents: Charles Francis Adams Sr.; Abigail Brown Brooks
- Relatives: John Quincy Adams (grandfather); Peter Chardon Brooks (grandfather); John Adams (great grandfather); Henry Cabot Lodge (brother-in-law)

Peter Chardon Brooks Adams (June 24, 1848 – February 13, 1927) was an American attorney, historian, political scientist and critic of capitalism.

== Early life and education ==
Adams was born in Quincy, Massachusetts, on June 24, 1848, son of Charles Francis Adams and Abigail Brown Brooks. He attended schools in the United States and in Europe.

Adams was a great-grandson of Founding Father and President John Adams, a grandson of President John Quincy Adams, the youngest son of U.S. diplomat Charles Francis Adams, and brother to Charles Francis Adams Jr. and Henry Adams. Henry was himself a philosopher, historian, and novelist, whose theories of history were influenced by his brother's work. His maternal grandfather was Peter Chardon Brooks, the wealthiest man in Boston at the time of his death.

He graduated from Harvard University in 1870 and studied at Harvard Law School in 1870 and 1871. Adams was secretary to his father in Geneva, in 1872, where the latter was an arbitrator upon the Alabama claims, under the Treaty of Washington. He was admitted to the bar in 1873, practiced law in Boston until 1881, and then devoted himself to literary work.

== Social theories ==
Adams believed that commercial civilizations rise and fall in predictable cycles. First, masses of people draw together in large population centers and engage in commercial activities. As their desire for wealth grows, they discard spiritual and creative values. Their greed leads to distrust and dishonesty, and eventually the society crumbles when a new, more economically energetic society takes its place.

In The Law of Civilization and Decay (1896), Adams noted that as new population centers emerged in the west, centers of world trade shifted from Constantinople to Venice to Amsterdam to London. This work has been compared to the later, longer works Decline of the West (1918) by Oswald Spengler and A Study of History (1934–1961) by Arnold Toynbee.

"In proportion as movement accelerates societies consolidate, and as societies consolidate they pass through a profound intellectual change. Energy ceases to find vent through the imagination and takes the form of capital; hence as civilizations advance, the imaginative temperament tends to disappear, while the economic instinct is fostered and thus substantially new varieties of men come to possess the world.

Nothing so portentous overhangs humanity as this mysterious and relentless acceleration of movement, which changes methods of competition and alters paths of trade; for by it countless millions of men and women are foredoomed to happiness or misery as certainly as the beasts and trees, which have flourished in the wilderness, are destined to vanish when the soil is subdued by man.

The Romans amassed the treasure by which they administered their Empire, through the plunder and enslavement of the world. The Empire cemented by that treasure crumbled when adverse exchanges carried the bullion of Italy to the shore of the Bosphorus. An accelerated movement among the semi-barbarians of the West caused the agony of the Crusades, amidst which Constantinople fell as the Italian cities rose; while Venice and Genoa, and with them the whole Arabic civilization, shriveled when Portugal established direct communication with Hindoostan.

The opening of the ocean as a highroad precipitated the Reformation and built up Antwerp, while in the end it ruined Spain; and finally the last great quickening of the age of steam, which centralized the world at London, bathed the earth in blood from the Mississippi to the Ganges. Thus religions are preached and are forgotten, empires rise and fall, philosophies are born and die, art and poetry bloom and fade, as societies pass from the disintegration wherein imagination kindles to the consolidation whose pressure ends in death."

—The Law of Civilization and Decay (1896)

Adams predicted in America's Economic Supremacy (1900) that an "Anglo-Saxon alliance" would arise in opposition to China and that New York City would become the center of world trade.

== Personal life ==
In 1889, Adams married Evelyn Davis, the daughter of Admiral Charles Henry Davis. They did not have children. Evelyn's sister Anna was the wife of Henry Cabot Lodge. Her sister Louisa was the wife of John Dandridge Henley Luce, the son of Stephen Luce.

Adams hired Wilhelmina Harris as social secretary for himself and his wife in 1920. Harris lived with and worked for them until both Brooks and Evelyn died.

== Recognition ==
He was elected a Fellow of the American Academy of Arts and Sciences in 1918.

== Legacy ==
Brooks Adams was the last Adams to live at the family home, Peacefield, in Quincy, Massachusetts. After Adams's death, in accordance with his wishes, the house became a museum. It was first run through the family and then, later, by the National Park Service. Peacefield is now part of the Adams National Historical Park.

== Portraits ==
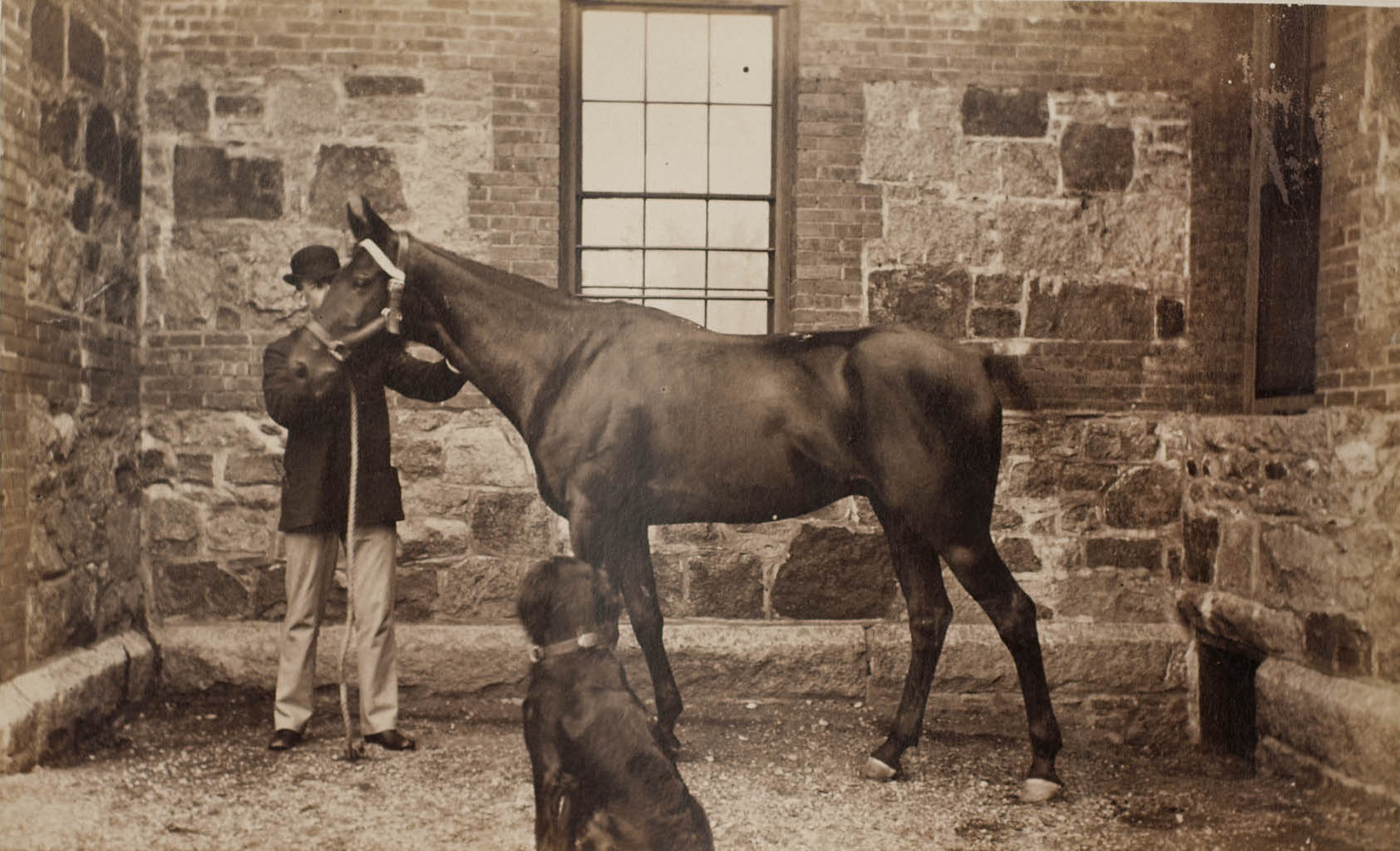
Adams with horse and dog, photographed by his sister-in-law, Marian Hooper Adams (ca. 1883)

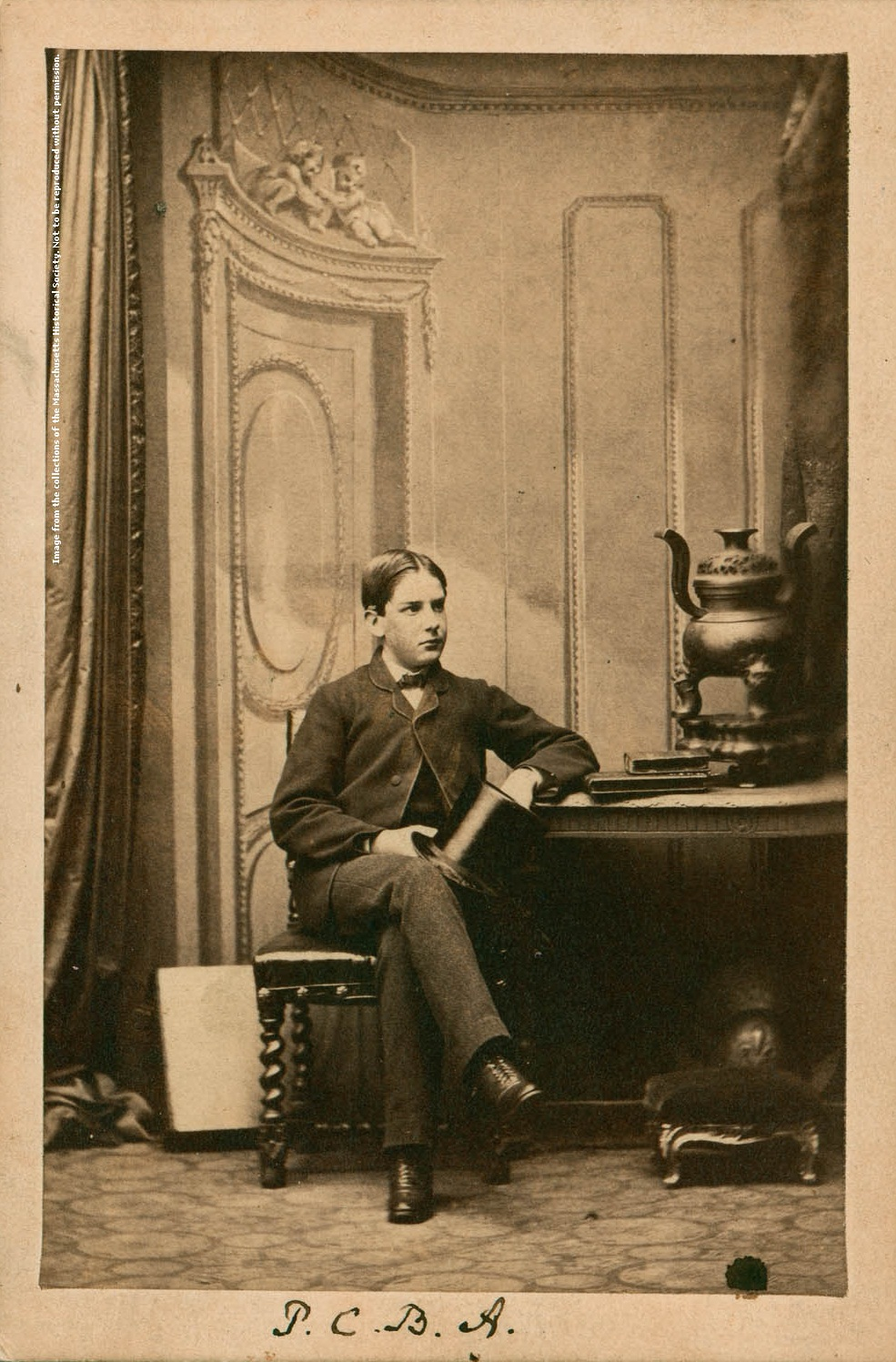
Adams, no date

== Family tree ==
Adams family tree

John Adams (1735–1826)	Abigail Adams (née Smith) (1744–1818)
William Stephens Smith (1755–1816)	Abigail Amelia Adams Smith (1765–1813)	John Quincy Adams (1767–1848)	Louisa Catherine Adams (née Johnson) (1775–1852)	Charles Adams (1770–1800)	Thomas Boylston Adams (1772–1832)
George Washington Adams (1801–1829)	John Adams II (1803–1834)	Charles Francis Adams Sr. (1807–1886)	Abigail Brown Brooks (1808–1889)
Frances Cadwalader Crowninshield (1839–1911)	John Quincy Adams II (1833–1894)	Charles Francis Adams Jr. (1835–1915)	Henry Brooks Adams (1838–1918)	Marian Hooper Adams (1843–1885)	Peter Chardon Brooks Adams (1848–1927)
George Casper Adams (1863–1900)	Charles Francis Adams III (1866–1954)	Frances Adams (née Lovering) (1869–1956)	John Adams (1875–1964)
Henry Sturgis Morgan (1900–1982)	Catherine Lovering Adams Morgan (1902–1988)	Charles Francis Adams IV (1910–1999)	Thomas Boylston Adams (1910–1997)

== Works ==
- The Emancipation of Massachusetts: The Dream and the Reality, Houghton Mifflin Company, 1919 [1st Pub. 1887].
- The Gold Standard: An Historical Study, Alfred Mudge & Son, 1894.
- The Law of Civilization and Decay: An Essay on History, The Macmillan Company, 1895.
- America's Economic Supremacy, The Macmillan Co., 1900.
- The New Empire, The Macmillan Company, 1902.
- Railways as Public Agents: A Study in Sovereignty, Boston, 1910.
- Theory of Social Revolutions, The Macmillan Company, 1913.

=== Essays ===
- "The Spanish War and the Equilibrium of the World," The Forum 25 (6), August 1898.
- "The New Struggle for Life Among Nations," McClure's Magazine 12 (6), April 1899.
- "England's Decadence in the West Indies," The Forum, June 1899.
- "War and Economic Competition," Scribner's 31 (3), March 1902.
- "John Hay," McClure's Magazine 19 (2), June 1902.
- "Legal Supervision of the Transportation Tax," The North American Review, September 1904.
- "Nature of Law: Methods and Aim of Legal Education." In: Centralization and the Law: Scientific Legal Education. Boston: Little, Brown & Company, 1906.
- "Law Under Inequality: Monopoly." In: Centralization and the Law: Scientific Legal Education. Boston: Little, Brown & Company, 1906.
- "A Problem in Civilization," The Atlantic Monthly, Vol. CVI, 1910.
- "The Collapse of Capitalistic Government," The Atlantic Monthly, Vol. CXI, 1913.

=== Other ===
- Henry Adams, The Degradation of the Democratic Dogma, with an introduction by Brooks Adams. New York: The Macmillan Company, 1919.

== Bibliography ==
- American National Biography, vol. 1, pp. 70–71.
- World Book Encyclopedia 1988.
- "Adams, Brooks", The New International Encyclopædia. New York: Dodd, Mead and Co., 1905.
- "Adams, Charles Francis", Appletons' Cyclopædia of American Biography. New York: D. Appleton and Co., 1900.
- "Adams, Brooks" in The Encyclopedia Americana. New York, 1920.
- "Adams, Brooks", Collier's New Encyclopedia. New York: P.F. Collier & Son Co., 1921.
