= John Quincy Adams II =

American politician (1833–1894)

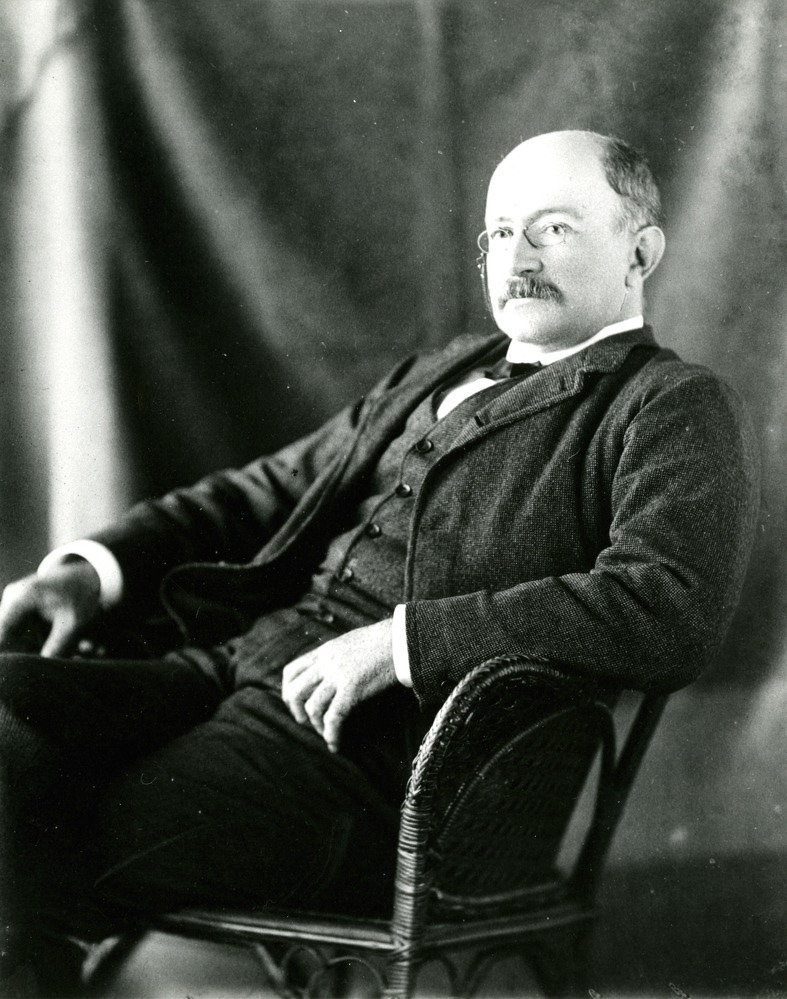
- Adams as a member of the Massachusetts House of Representatives

Member of the Massachusetts House of Representatives from the 6th Norfolk district
- In office January 7, 1874 – January 5, 1875
- Preceded by: James A. Stetson
- Succeeded by: William A. Hodges
- In office January 4, 1871 – January 2, 1872
- Preceded by: Edmund B. Taylor
- Succeeded by: Henry H. Faxon
- In office January 1, 1868 – January 6, 1869
- Preceded by: George Gill
- Succeeded by: Henry Barker
- In office January 3, 1866 – January 1, 1867
- Preceded by: Henry H. Faxon
- Succeeded by: George Gill

Personal details
- Born: September 22, 1833 Boston, Massachusetts, U.S.
- Died: August 14, 1894 (aged 60) Quincy, Massachusetts, U.S.
- Resting place: Mount Wollaston Cemetery, Quincy, Massachusetts
- Party: Republican (before 1867); Democratic (1867–94)
- Spouse: Frances Cadwallader Crowninshield (m. 1861)
- Relations: Adams political family; Quincy political family
- Children: John; George; Charles III; Frances; Arthur; Abigail
- Parent(s): Charles Francis Adams Sr. Abigail Brown Adams
- Education: Harvard College

Military service
- Allegiance: United States of America (Union)
- Branch/service: Massachusetts Militia
- Years of service: 1861–1865
- Rank: Colonel
- Unit: Staff of Governor John Albion Andrew
- Battles/wars: American Civil War

John Quincy Adams II (September 22, 1833 – August 14, 1894) was an American politician who represented Quincy in the Massachusetts House of Representatives from 1866 to 1867, 1868 to 1869, 1871 to 1872, and from 1874 to 1875.

Adams served as a colonel in the Union Army during the American Civil War under Governor John Albion Andrew of Massachusetts. Later in life, he left the Republican Party in 1867 for the Democratic Party.

== Early life ==
Coat of Arms of John Adams, the second U.S. president

John Quincy Adams II was born on September 22, 1833, in Boston, Massachusetts, the second of seven children born to Charles Francis Adams Sr. and Abigail Brown Adams.

He was a grandson of the sixth United States president, John Quincy Adams (his namesake), and a great-grandson of the second president, John Adams. His maternal grandfather was shipping magnate Peter Chardon Brooks (1767–1849).

He graduated from Harvard College in 1853, studied law, and two years later was admitted to the Suffolk County bar, and practiced in Boston. He followed his profession for a short time, then, becoming interested in agriculture, he established an experimental model farm of five hundred acres near Quincy, Massachusetts.

== Career ==
During the Civil War he served as an aide-de-camp on the staff of Governor John Albion Andrew, first as a lieutenant colonel, and later as a colonel. During the war his duties included visiting Massachusetts units in the field and providing the governor status reports on their condition. In 1862, he made inspection visits to several Massachusetts units operating in North Carolina.

Adams served in several local offices in Quincy, including town meeting moderator, school board chairman and judge of the local court. He was elected to the Massachusetts state legislature as a Republican, but soon switched to the Democratic Party because of his dissatisfaction with Republican Reconstruction policies. In addition to serving in the Massachusetts House of Representatives in 1865, 1867, 1870 and 1873, he was the unsuccessful Democratic nominee for Governor of Massachusetts in every year from 1867 to 1871. (Governors served one year terms until 1918.)

Adams received one vote for the Democratic nomination for President of the United States at the 1868 Democratic National Convention. In 1872, the faction of Democrats that refused to support Horace Greeley, the fusion candidate of Democrats and the Liberal Republican Party, nominated Charles O'Conor for president and Adams for vice president on the "Straight-Out Democratic" ticket. They declined, but their names remained on the ballot in some states.

In 1873, he was the unsuccessful nominee for lieutenant governor. After losing an election for lieutenant governor in 1876, Adams refused most further involvement in politics, though he was considered by Grover Cleveland for a cabinet position in 1893. In 1877, he was made a member of the Harvard Corporation.

== Personal life ==
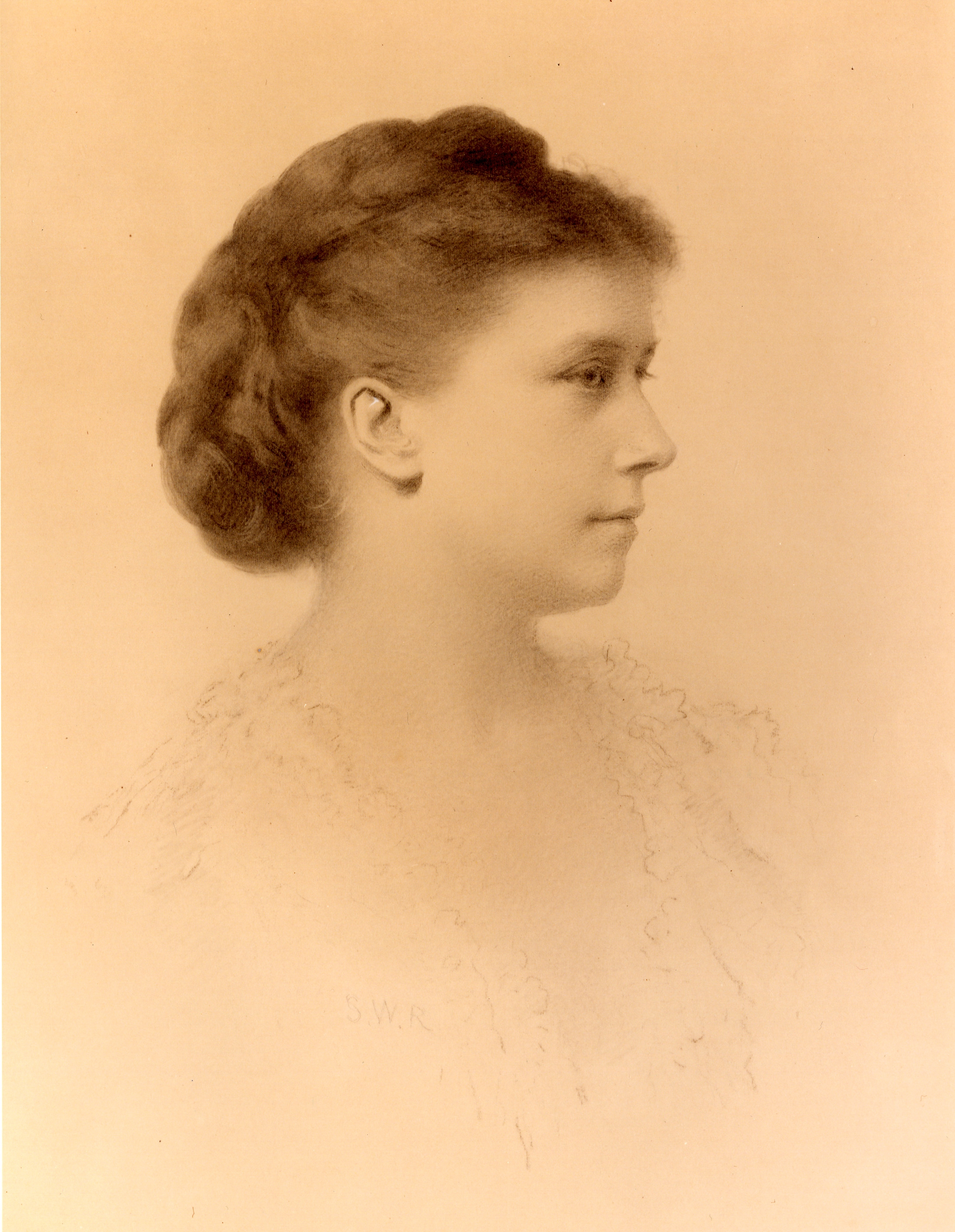
A portrait of Fanny Crowninshield by Samuel Worcester Rowse.

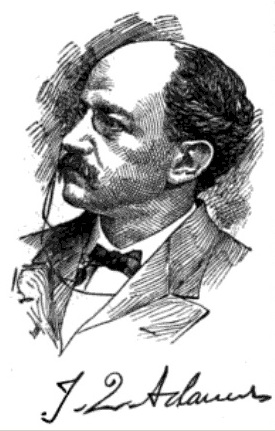
Illustration accompanying Adams's biography in 1913's Lamb's Biographical Dictionary of the United States, Volume 1

In 1861, Adams married Frances "Fanny" Cadwalader Crowninshield (1839–1911), daughter of George Crowninshield (1812–1857) and Harriet Sears Crowninshield (1809–1873) of the politically powerful Crowninshield family. Fanny was the granddaughter of former United States Secretary of the Navy under presidents Madison and Monroe, Benjamin Williams Crowninshield. Their children were:

- John Quincy Adams III. (1862–1876), who died young.
- George Caspar Adams (1863–1900), who was the head coach of the Harvard University football program.
- Charles Francis Adams III (1866–1954), who served as Secretary of the Navy, and who married Frances Lovering.
- Frances "Fanny" C. Adams (1873–1876), who died in childhood.
- Arthur Charles Adams (1877–1943), who served as vice president of the Adams Trust Company, the Colony Trust and the New England Trust Company.
- Abigail "Hitty" Adams (1879–1974), who married Robert Homans in 1907.

Adams died at age 60 in Wollaston, Massachusetts on August 14, 1894. He was buried at Mount Wollaston Cemetery in Quincy. His widow died in 1911, and left an estate worth $1,200,000 to their three surviving children.

=== Descendants ===
Through his daughter, Abigail, he was the grandfather of George Casper Homans (1910–1989), a sociologist and the founder of behavioral sociology and the Social Exchange Theory.

== Family tree ==
Adams family tree

John Adams (1735–1826)	Abigail Adams (née Smith) (1744–1818)
William Stephens Smith (1755–1816)	Abigail Amelia Adams Smith (1765–1813)	John Quincy Adams (1767–1848)	Louisa Catherine Adams (née Johnson) (1775–1852)	Charles Adams (1770–1800)	Thomas Boylston Adams (1772–1832)
George Washington Adams (1801–1829)	John Adams II (1803–1834)	Charles Francis Adams Sr. (1807–1886)	Abigail Brown Brooks (1808–1889)
Frances Cadwalader Crowninshield (1839–1911)	John Quincy Adams II (1833–1894)	Charles Francis Adams Jr. (1835–1915)	Henry Brooks Adams (1838–1918)	Marian Hooper Adams (1843–1885)	Peter Chardon Brooks Adams (1848–1927)
George Casper Adams (1863–1900)	Charles Francis Adams III (1866–1954)	Frances Adams (née Lovering) (1869–1956)	John Adams (1875–1964)
Henry Sturgis Morgan (1900–1982)	Catherine Lovering Adams Morgan (1902–1988)	Charles Francis Adams IV (1910–1999)	Thomas Boylston Adams (1910–1997)

== See also ==
- 1868 Massachusetts legislature
- 1874 Massachusetts legislature

Party political offices
Preceded by Theodore H. Sweetser	Democratic nominee for Governor of Massachusetts; 1867, 1868, 1869, 1870, 1871	Succeeded by Francis W. Bird
