= Marian Hooper Adams =

American socialite (1843–1885)

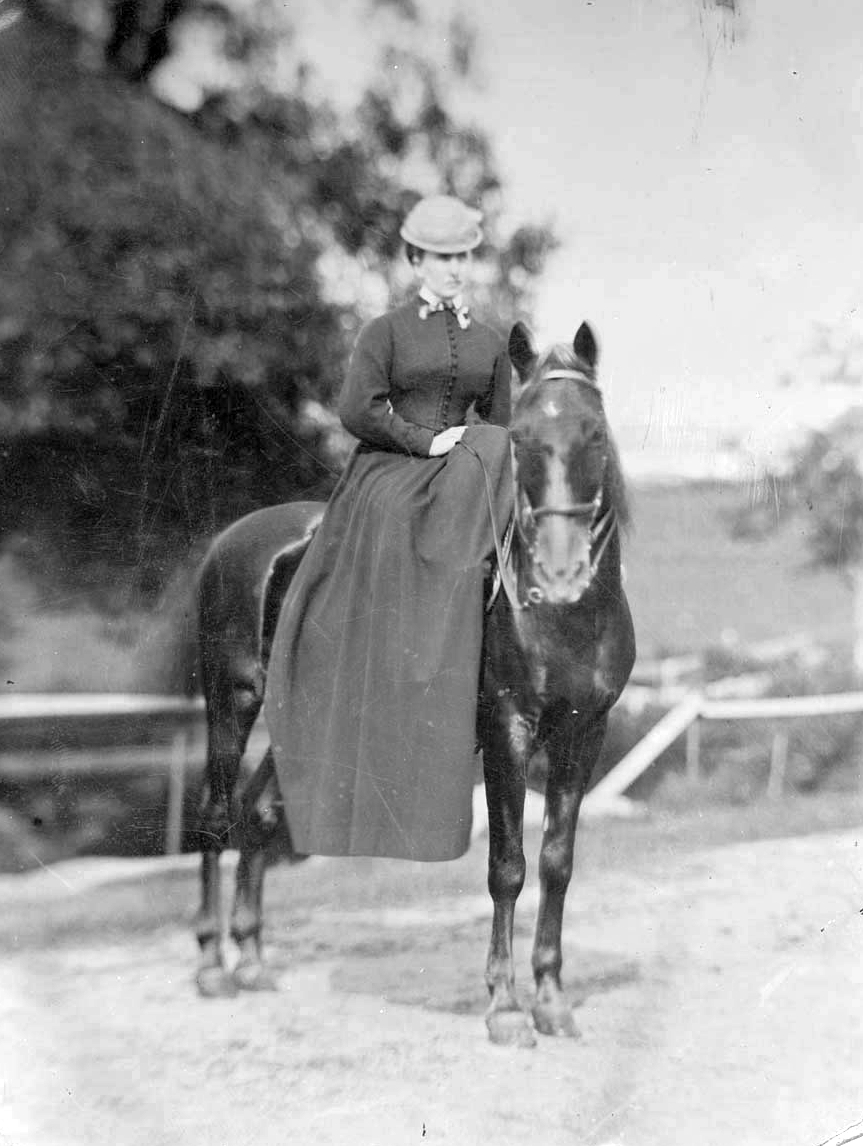
- At Beverly farms in 1869
- Born: Marian Hooper; September 13, 1843; Boston, Massachusetts, U.S.
- Died: December 6, 1885 (aged 42); Washington, D.C., U.S.
- Resting place: Rock Creek Cemetery, Washington, D.C.
- Other name: Clover
- Spouse: Henry B. Adams (m. 1872)

Marian "Clover" Hooper Adams (September 13, 1843 – December 6, 1885) was an American socialite, active society hostess, arbiter of Washington, DC, and an accomplished amateur photographer.

Adams, who has been cited as the inspiration for writer Henry James's Daisy Miller (1878) and The Portrait of a Lady (1881), was married to writer Henry Adams. After her suicide, he commissioned the famous Adams Memorial, which features an enigmatic androgynous bronze sculpture by Augustus Saint-Gaudens, to stand at the site of her, and his, grave.

After Adams' death, her husband destroyed all the letters that she had ever written to him and rarely, if ever, spoke of her in public. She was also omitted from his The Education of Henry Adams. However, in letters to her friend Anne Palmer Fell, he opened up about his 12 years of happiness with his wife and his difficulty in dealing with her loss.

== Early life ==
She was born in Boston, Massachusetts, the third and youngest child of Robert William Hooper (1810 – April 15, 1885) and Ellen H. Sturgis (1812–November 3, 1848). Her siblings were Ellen Sturgis "Nella" Hooper (1838–1887), who married professor Ephraim Whitman Gurney (1829–1886); and Edward William "Ned" Hooper (1839–1901). The Hooper family was wealthy and prominent. Adams' birthplace and childhood home in Boston was at 114 Beacon Street, Beacon Hill. When she was five years old, her mother, a Transcendentalist poet, died and she became very close to her physician father. She was privately educated at a girls school in Cambridge, which was run by Elizabeth and Louis Agassiz.

Adams volunteered for the Sanitary Commission during the Civil War. She defied convention by insisting on watching the review of William Tecumseh Sherman and Ulysses S. Grant's armies in 1865. In 1866, she traveled abroad, where she is said to have met fellow Bostonian Henry Adams in London. Her father and she were living at their home in Beverly, Massachusetts, in July 1870.

On June 27, 1872, Adams and she were married in Boston, and spent their honeymoon in Europe. Upon their return, he taught at Harvard and their home at 91 Marlborough Street, Boston, became a gathering place for a lively circle of intellectuals. In 1877, they moved to Washington, DC, where their home on Lafayette Square, across from the White House, became a popular place for socializing.

Adams remained close to her father, writing him regularly. In June 1880, Dr. Hooper was living at his household on Beacon Street in Boston. Her gossipy letters to her father, other family members, and friends, reveal her to be a gifted reporter and provide an insightful view of the Washington and politics of the day, while the ones she wrote from Europe are not ordinary travel letters, but shrewd reflections on character and society, revealing a critical and sprightly mind.

From her reports written in letters, it was widely speculated that actually Clover Hooper Adams was the "anonymous" author of Democracy: An American Novel (1880), which was not credited to her husband until 43 years later.

== Photography ==
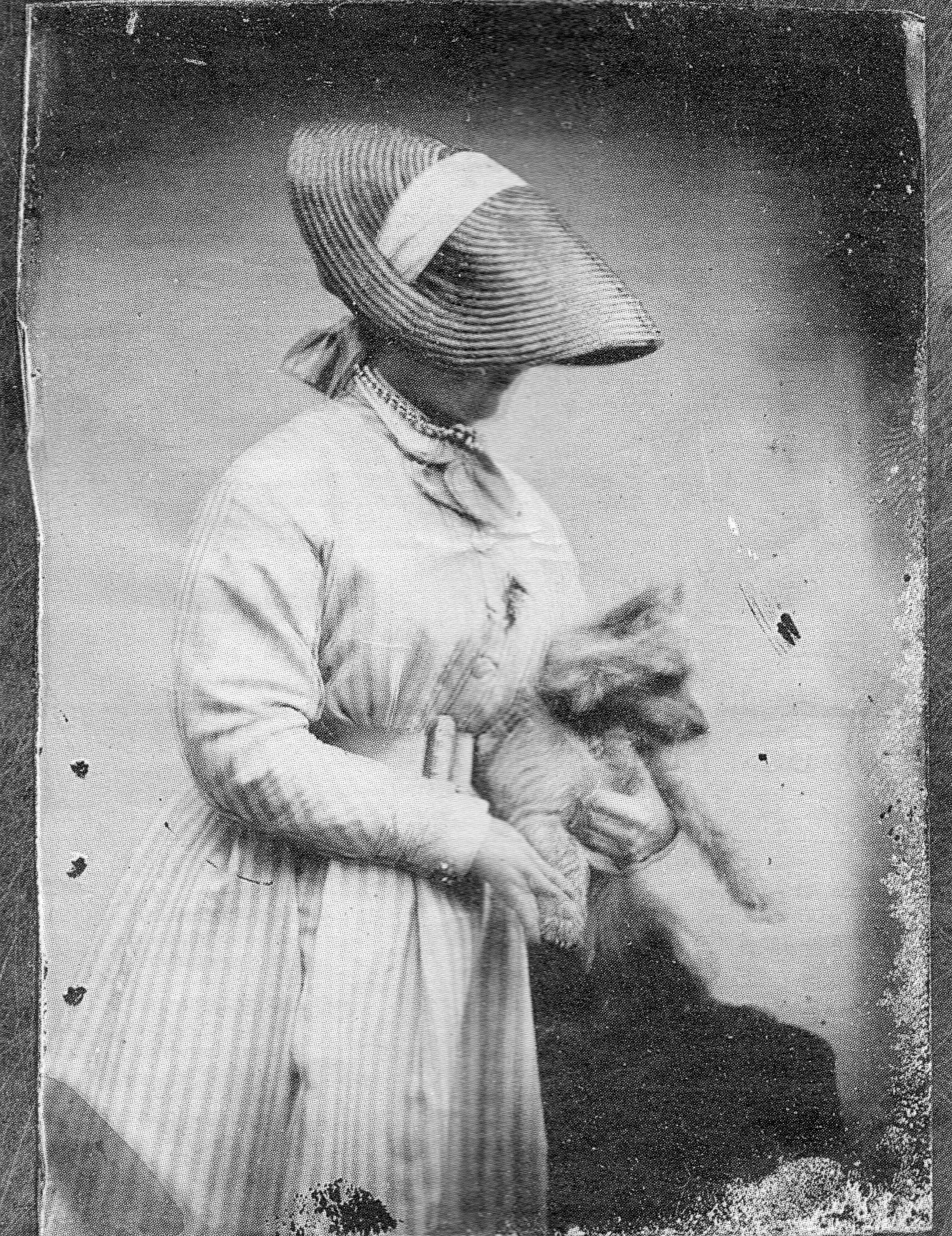
Portrait of Clover Adams

In 1883, Adams became active in photography and was one of the earliest American portrait photographers. Familiarizing herself with the chemicals, she did all her own developing.

Her photographs, which reveal an extraordinary eye, consist of formal and informal portraits of politicians, family friends, various members of the Adams and Hooper families, family pets, and still lifes of interior and exterior locales, including photographs of Washington, Bladensburg, Maryland, Old Sweet Springs, and the Adams family homes in Quincy and Beverly Farms, Massachusetts.

These images provide insights into 19th-century America and a woman's place in it. Besides the images, Adams also left behind a great deal of information about her photography, including meticulous chronological notes she kept while working in her darkroom, listing photographs and commenting on exposures, lighting, etc., and the references in her letters.

Her work was widely admired, although her husband apparently would not allow her to become professional and discouraged any publication of her photographs.

== Final years ==
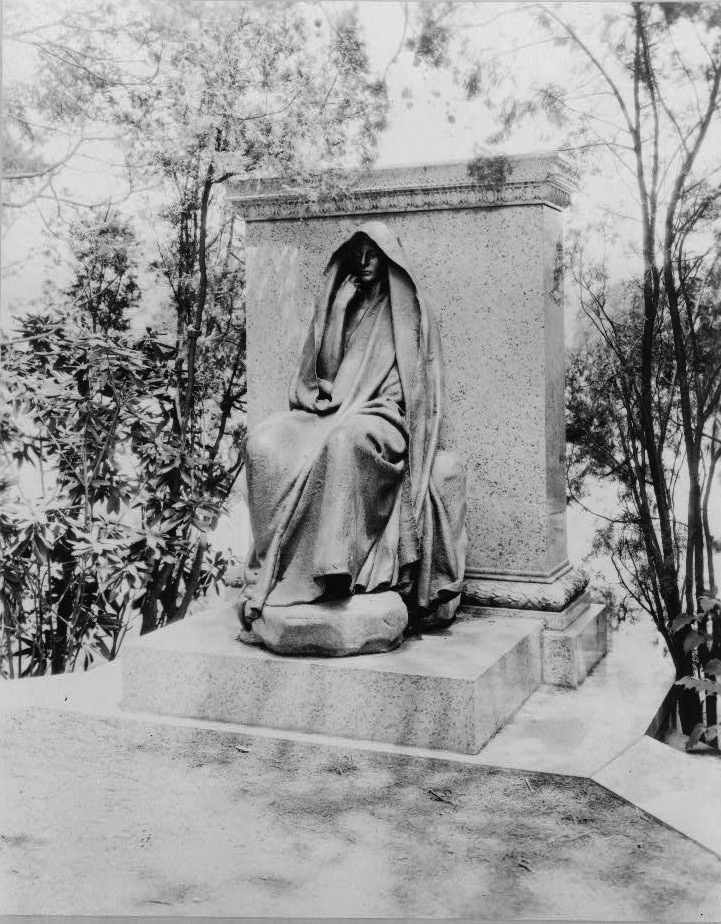
Adams' monument in Rock Creek Cemetery

The Adams' letters reveal their household to be a normal and happy one. In the beginning, he confessed himself "absurdly in love," and she spoke again and again of Henry's "utter devotion."

Adams and her husband hired architect H. H. Richardson and were in the process of having a new home built on Lafayette Square, which was adjacent to the Richardson-designed house being built for John Hay, when her father died on April 13, 1885. After Dr. Hooper's death, she sank into bouts of overwhelming depression.

While awaiting the completion of the house, they rented one nearby on H Street. Adams documented the construction of the houses with her camera.

While alone in her bedroom in her temporary home on H Street on Sunday, December 6, 1885, she swallowed potassium cyanide, which she used in developing her photographs, and died at age 42. Her husband found her lying on the rug before her bedroom fire. The evening newspaper reported that she had suddenly dropped dead from paralysis of the heart.

Her husband commissioned sculptor Augustus Saint-Gaudens and architect Stanford White to create a memorial to mark her grave in Rock Creek Cemetery. The haunting Adams Memorial is probably the most famous of all monuments in the cemetery and is generally considered to be Saint-Gaudens' most famous sculpture.

In a letter from December 5, 1886, to friend Anne Palmer Fell, Henry Adams wrote, "During the last eighteen months I have not had the good luck to attend my own funeral, but with that exception I have buried pretty nearly everything I lived for."

In a letter to Henry Adams, John Hay wrote, "Is it any consolation to remember her as she was? That bright, intrepid spirit, that keen, fine intellect, that lofty scorn for all that was mean, that social charm which made your house such a one as Washington never knew before and made hundreds of people love her as much as they admired her." In a letter to a friend, Henry James wrote, "poor Mrs. Adams found, the other day, the solution of the knottiness of existence."

== Legacy ==
The Massachusetts Historical Society in Boston houses the photograph collection of Clover Adams and other materials.

== Family tree ==
Adams family tree

John Adams (1735–1826)	Abigail Adams (née Smith) (1744–1818)
William Stephens Smith (1755–1816)	Abigail Amelia Adams Smith (1765–1813)	John Quincy Adams (1767–1848)	Louisa Catherine Adams (née Johnson) (1775–1852)	Charles Adams (1770–1800)	Thomas Boylston Adams (1772–1832)
George Washington Adams (1801–1829)	John Adams II (1803–1834)	Charles Francis Adams Sr. (1807–1886)	Abigail Brown Brooks (1808–1889)
Frances Cadwalader Crowninshield (1839–1911)	John Quincy Adams II (1833–1894)	Charles Francis Adams Jr. (1835–1915)	Henry Brooks Adams (1838–1918)	Marian Hooper Adams (1843–1885)	Peter Chardon Brooks Adams (1848–1927)
George Casper Adams (1863–1900)	Charles Francis Adams III (1866–1954)	Frances Adams (née Lovering) (1869–1956)	John Adams (1875–1964)
Henry Sturgis Morgan (1900–1982)	Catherine Lovering Adams Morgan (1902–1988)	Charles Francis Adams IV (1910–1999)	Thomas Boylston Adams (1910–1997)
