= Charles Francis Adams IV =

American electronics industrialist

- Born: May 2, 1910; Boston, Massachusetts, U.S.
- Died: January 5, 1999 (aged 88); Dover, Massachusetts, U.S.
- Education: Harvard University
- Known for: President of Raytheon; 1948–1960, 1962–1964
- Spouses: Margaret Stockton Adams (died): Beatrice D. Penati
- Children: 4
- Parent: Charles Francis Adams III
- Relatives: Adams political family
- Military career
- Allegiance: United States
- Branch: United States Navy
- Service years: 1932–1946
- Rank: Commander
- Commands: USS William Seiverling
- Conflicts: World War II

Charles Francis Adams IV (May 2, 1910 – January 5, 1999) was an American electronics industrialist, United States Naval officer, great-great grandson of the sixth president John Quincy Adams and great-great-great-grandson of the second president John Adams.

== Early life ==
Charles Francis Adams IV was born on May 2, 1910, in Boston, Massachusetts, to United States Secretary of the Navy Charles Francis Adams III (1866–1954), thus a great-great-great-grandson of U.S. President John Adams and great-great-grandson of his son John Quincy Adams. He attended St. Mark's School, graduated from Harvard College in 1932 and attended Harvard Graduate School of Business Administration. Adams was a sixth-generation Harvard legacy student (John Adams graduated from Harvard in 1755).

== Career ==
Adams was commissioned as an ensign in the Naval Reserve on 23 June 1932 and was promoted to lieutenant (junior grade) on 23 June 1937. He served on active duty during World War II. Adams was promoted to the rank of lieutenant commander on 1 May 1943 and to commander on 1 March 1944. He took command of the destroyer escort USS William Seiverling when she was commissioned on 1 June 1944. The Seiverling conducted anti-submarine operations in the Pacific Theater, was under air attack off Okinawa and supported the liberation of the Philippines. He left the service in 1946.

He served as the first president of the Raytheon Company between 1948 and 1960, and again from 1962 to 1964. He served as its chairman between 1960 and 1962, and again from 1964 until 1975. During his tenure, Raytheon grew from a manufacturer of transistors and vacuum tubes into a maker of missiles and military-oriented radar and communications systems.

== Personal life ==
Adams married twice. His first marriage was to Margaret Stockton by whom he had four children: Abigail, Alison, Charles V, and Timothy. His second marriage was to Beatrice D. Penati by whom he had one stepson: Giannotto Penati. He had a total of nine grandchildren and 13 great-grandchildren at the time of his death, on January 5, 1999, in Dover, Massachusetts, aged 88.

Adams was elected a Fellow of the American Academy of Arts and Sciences in 1959. He was awarded honorary degrees by Suffolk University, Northeastern University, Bates College, and Tufts University.

== Family tree ==
Adams family tree

John Adams (1735–1826)	Abigail Adams (née Smith) (1744–1818)
William Stephens Smith (1755–1816)	Abigail Amelia Adams Smith (1765–1813)	John Quincy Adams (1767–1848)	Louisa Catherine Adams (née Johnson) (1775–1852)	Charles Adams (1770–1800)	Thomas Boylston Adams (1772–1832)
George Washington Adams (1801–1829)	John Adams II (1803–1834)	Charles Francis Adams Sr. (1807–1886)	Abigail Brown Brooks (1808–1889)
Frances Cadwalader Crowninshield (1839–1911)	John Quincy Adams II (1833–1894)	Charles Francis Adams Jr. (1835–1915)	Henry Brooks Adams (1838–1918)	Marian Hooper Adams (1843–1885)	Peter Chardon Brooks Adams (1848–1927)
George Casper Adams (1863–1900)	Charles Francis Adams III (1866–1954)	Frances Adams (née Lovering) (1869–1956)	John Adams (1875–1964)
Henry Sturgis Morgan (1900–1982)	Catherine Lovering Adams Morgan (1902–1988)	Charles Francis Adams IV (1910–1999)	Thomas Boylston Adams (1910–1997)
