= George Washington Adams =

American politician (1801–1829)

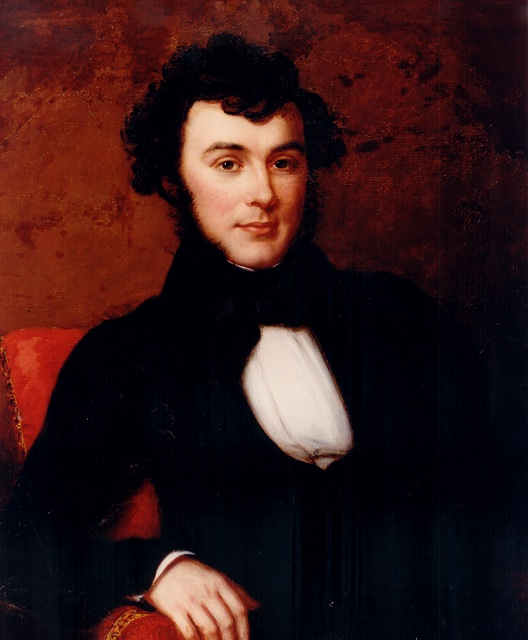
- Portrait by Charles Bird King c. 1820

Member of the Boston Common Council from the 7th ward
- In office May 12, 1828 – April 30, 1829
- Preceded by: Waldo Flint
- Succeeded by: Isaac Danforth

Member of the Massachusetts House of Representatives
- In office 1826–1827

Personal details
- Born: April 12, 1801 Berlin, Brandenburg, Prussia, Holy Roman Empire
- Died: April 30, 1829 (aged 28) Long Island Sound, U.S.
- Cause of death: Suicide
- Children: 1
- Parents: John Quincy Adams; Louisa Johnson
- Relatives: Adams political family
- Education: Harvard University

George Washington Adams (April 12, 1801 – April 30, 1829) was born in what was the Holy Roman Empire to American parents. He became an attorney and politician. He was the eldest son of U.S. president John Quincy Adams, the sixth President of the United States, and a grandson of John Adams, the second President of the United States. Adams served in the Massachusetts House of Representatives and on the Boston Common Council. He is believed to have died by suicide at age 28.

== Biography ==
George Washington Adams was born in Berlin, part of the Holy Roman Empire, on April 12, 1801. He was a member of the distinguished Adams political family. Adams was the eldest son of John Quincy Adams, later the sixth president of the United States, who was then serving as a diplomatic representative of the United States, and his wife Louisa Catherine Adams. He was named for the first president, George Washington. His paternal grandfather John Adams was the first vice president of the United States and also the second president. He was born a month after his grandfather left office.

Adams's paternal grandmother, First Lady Abigail Adams, was unhappy with the decision of her son to name the child after Washington and not after her husband. She thought the decision "ill judged" and "wrong," adding that John Adams also seemed offended. John Quincy Adams's second son John Adams II (1803–1834) was named after his grandfather.

Adams graduated from Harvard College in the Class of 1821 and studied law. After briefly practicing as an attorney, he ran for state office. He was elected to the Massachusetts House of Representatives in 1826 and served one year. In 1828, Adams served on the Boston Common Council, being elected from ward 7. He delivered an Independence Day speech, "An Oration delivered at Quincy, on the Fifth of July, 1824", which was later published as a pamphlet.

Adams disappeared on April 30, 1829, while on board the steamship Benjamin Franklin in Long Island Sound during passage from Boston to Washington, D.C. He was last seen at about 2 A.M., and his hat and cloak were found on deck, leading to the conclusion that he had intentionally jumped. His body washed ashore on June 10. An alcoholic, Adams had left notes hinting that he intended to kill himself; he had appeared to be delusional while on the ship, asking the captain to return to shore and declaring that the other passengers were conspiring against him. The consensus in news accounts of the time and among historians subsequently is that he died by suicide by drowning after he jumped from the Benjamin Franklin.

== Family ==
Adams and his brothers Charles and John were all rivals for the same woman, their second cousin Mary Catherine Hellen, who lived with the John Quincy Adams family after the death of her parents. In 1828, John Adams II married Mary Hellen at a ceremony in the White House, and both his brothers refused to attend.

Adams fathered an out-of-wedlock child with a mistress, Eliza Dolph. Dolph was the chambermaid to Dr. Thomas Welsh, the Adams family's Boston doctor. She had a child in December 1828 and was moved to another location so Adams could visit her and the baby in secrecy. The child never had a recorded first name and a letter mentions "Eliza Dolph has gained her health and lost her child," suggesting the child died in infancy.

== Family tree ==
Adams family tree

John Adams (1735–1826)	Abigail Adams (née Smith) (1744–1818)
William Stephens Smith (1755–1816)	Abigail Amelia Adams Smith (1765–1813)	John Quincy Adams (1767–1848)	Louisa Catherine Adams (née Johnson) (1775–1852)	Charles Adams (1770–1800)	Thomas Boylston Adams (1772–1832)
George Washington Adams (1801–1829)	John Adams II (1803–1834)	Charles Francis Adams Sr. (1807–1886)	Abigail Brown Brooks (1808–1889)
Frances Cadwalader Crowninshield (1839–1911)	John Quincy Adams II (1833–1894)	Charles Francis Adams Jr. (1835–1915)	Henry Brooks Adams (1838–1918)	Marian Hooper Adams (1843–1885)	Peter Chardon Brooks Adams (1848–1927)
George Casper Adams (1863–1900)	Charles Francis Adams III (1866–1954)	Frances Adams (née Lovering) (1869–1956)	John Adams (1875–1964)
Henry Sturgis Morgan (1900–1982)	Catherine Lovering Adams Morgan (1902–1988)	Charles Francis Adams IV (1910–1999)	Thomas Boylston Adams (1910–1997)

== Bibliography ==
- McCullough, David (2001). John Adams. New York: Simon & Schuster. p. 144. ISBN 978-1-4165-7588-7.
