= Wilhelmina Harris =

American historian and writer

- Born: March 22, 1896; Franklin, Alabama, United States
- Died: May 20, 1991 (aged 95); Quincy, Massachusetts, United States
- Resting place: Arlington National Cemetery
- Occupations: Social Secretary to Brooks Adams and his wife. Superintendent of Peacefield and later the Adams National Historical Park, National Park Service

Wilhelmina Sellers Harris (March 22, 1896 – May 20, 1991) was an American historian and writer. Harris’s connection to American history began in 1920 when she was hired as social secretary to Brooks Adams and his wife, Evelyn. Adams was the last descendant of U.S. Presidents John Adams and John Quincy Adams to live in the family home, Peacefield, also known as the Old House, in Quincy, Massachusetts. Harris lived and worked with them for almost seven years.

In 1948, after raising her family, Wilhelmina Harris applied for and was hired by the National Park Service to work at Peacefield, which it had recently added to its portfolio of historic sites, because of her intimate knowledge of the household. Two years later, Harris was promoted to superintendent and she continued to serve the Adams family and the National Park Service until her full retirement 37 years later, in 1987. By the time she retired, Wilhelmina Harris had written a dozen books on the property, overseen several Adams property construction updates, and received many professional awards.

== Career ==
In October 1920, recently graduated from college, Wilhelmina Harris was hired through an employment agency as social secretary to Brooks Adams and his wife. Harris lived with and worked intimately with the family.

The Adams household spent winters at their home on Beacon Hill in Boston and summers at the Old House in Quincy. Thomas Boylston Adams noted that "the twice-yearly trip from Quincy to Boston, a distance of a dozen miles, required the effort of Napoleon preparing to invade Russia. [...] All this Miss Sellers managed." Harris became student, protégé and confidante to Adams. Historian Laura Miller writes:

Adams took great pleasure in teaching Harris about his family’s history and the history of the Old House. He described in detail the different rooms and the many precious family heirlooms contained therein, from the furniture, rugs, and paintings to the silver and porcelain collections. He also shared with her extensive details and anecdotes about the garden, greenhouse, orchard, and trees. Harris dutifully committed these details to memory. As she learned more about the history of the Old House, she, too, began to feel invested in its future.

Harris also accompanied Adams on his frequent travels abroad. They spent weeks or months in London, Paris and the south of France (where they visited Edith Wharton), Italy, Egypt (where they met Howard Carter, who was preparing to open Tutankhamen's tomb), and Jerusalem, among other places.

This chapter of her career came to a close with the death of Brooks Adams on February 13, 1927; Evelyn Adams had died the previous December. In his will, Adams left Harris $30,000 (equivalent to $556,034 in 2025).

In 1948, the recently widowed Harris applied for a job as an Historic Aide at the Old House, now owned by the National Park Service and called the Adams Mansion National Historic Site. (Note: The word "Mansion" was dropped from the site's name in 1952.) Two years later, she was promoted to superintendent; she was the second, and for the entirety of her tenure the only, woman superintendent of an NPS national historic site. (Note: The first was Gertrude S. Cooper, appointed superintendent of the Vanderbilt Mansion National Historic Site in 1940.)

During her thirty-seven years as superintendent, Harris raised money, organized publicity events (including visits by General Douglas MacArthur and Lady Bird Johnson), developed relationships with the city of Quincy, and repaired, expanded and protected the physical environs of the site. But her interpretive approach to the history of the Old House, based on the stories she had heard from her first employer, remained constant, and that was not without its critics. In 1955, NPS Historian Frank Barnes wrote:

[There is] a lamentable lack of solid, scholarly information with regard to the Old House, and the life of the Adamses while there. Without meaning to disparage Mrs. Harris’ or Miss Cole’s efforts, it must be admitted that it seems unfortunate (in the long view) that visitor interpretation is almost entirely dependent on personal memory and sporadic reading.

Perhaps in response to this criticism, Harris compiled a ten-volume inventory of the contents of the Old House, including all of the legend and lore that had been passed down to her by Brooks Adams. Her former secretary and successor as park superintendent Marianne Peak told author Laura Miller that Harris "was never one to talk about any imperfections of the Adams family."

At her retirement in 1987, Thomas Boylston Adams remarked: "Sometimes, I think that Mrs. Harris has taken such wonderful care of this property that she invented the Adams family to go with it." She herself liked to say, "My duty here is to stand in the way of progress.”

== Personal life ==
Born in 1896 in Franklin, Alabama, Wilhelmina Sellers, known as "Willie" to her family, was the last of eight children born to William and May Sellers. In 1916 she moved to Boston to study piano at the Faelton Pianoforte School, graduating in 1920.

She married U.S. Army Colonel Frank Ephraim Harris on September 22, 1928. Col. Harris, twenty-eight years her senior, had been a friend of Adams, who had introduced them. (Note: Col. Harris had previously been married to Marie Geary Bonzano, the "heroine of the Laconia", with whom he had two daughters.) They purchased a large Colonial Revival home across the street from the Adams family home. Together they raised three sons, all alumni of Milton Academy and Harvard University.

- Frank Ephraim Jr. (1929–2023), PhD, Berkeley; Professor of physics, University of Utah.
- George Sellers (1931–2023), PhD, Harvard; Director of the Office of Analysis for Near East and South Asia in the Bureau of Intelligence and Research of the U.S. Department of State.
- A. Brooks (1935), PhD, Harvard; Professor of physics, University of Pennsylvania.

Harris gave private piano lessons from 1938 to 1948 and founded the Quincy Junior Concert Orchestra.

Colonel Harris died in 1947 and was buried in Arlington National Cemetery.

In 1991, Wilhelmina Sellers Harris died at the age of 95, four years after she fully retired from the NPS. She is buried at Arlington National Cemetery. Her obituary was published in the New York Times.

== Awards and recognition ==
- In 1970, Secretary Wally Hickel of the Department of the Interior presented her with the Department's highest award – the Distinguished Service Award.
- in 1972, Harris became an honorary member of the Adams Memorial Society, the only member who was not also a member of the Adams family.
- In 1983, she received the Sustained Special Achievement Award for her work on the restoration of the Adams' birthplaces and recently published booklet.
- Paul C. Nagel's 1983 book Descent From Glory: Four Generations of the John Adams Family is dedicated to Wilhelmina Sellers Harris.

== Bibliography ==
- Harris, Wilhelmina S. (1974) [1966-1974]. Furnishings Report, Old House (in ten volumes). Vol. I–X. Quincy, Massachusetts: The Adams National Historic Site.
- —— (Autumn 1969). "The Brooks Adams I Knew". The Yale Review. 59 (1): 50–70.
- —— (1983). The Adams National Historic Site: a Family's Legacy to America (PDF). Washington, D.C.: National Park Service, U.S. Dept. of the Interior.

== Sources ==
- Miller, Laura A. (2020a). "Things Kept and Cherished": A History of Adams National Historical Park (PDF). National Park Service.
