= John Adams II =

Son of U.S. President John Quincy Adams (1803–1834)

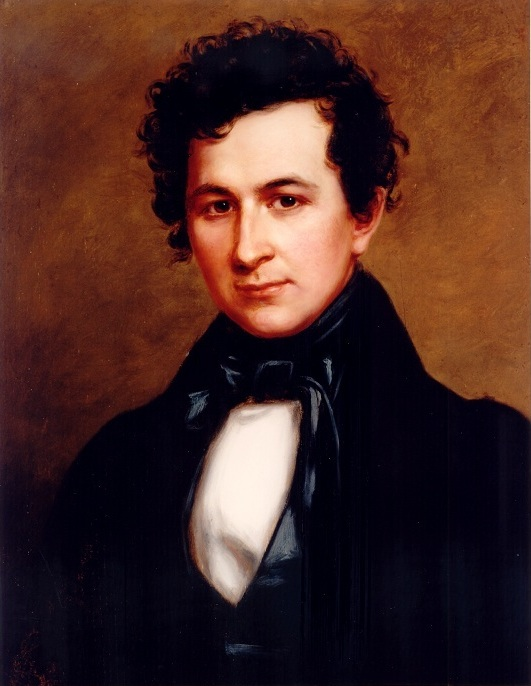
- Adams in 1820

Private Secretary to the President
- In office March 4, 1825 – March 4, 1829
- President: John Quincy Adams
- Preceded by: Samuel L. Gouverneur
- Succeeded by: Andrew Jackson Donelson

Personal details
- Born: July 4, 1803 Quincy, Massachusetts, U.S.
- Died: October 23, 1834 (aged 31) Washington, D.C., U.S.
- Party: Democratic-Republican; Adams Republican
- Spouse: Mary Catherine Hellen (m. 1828)
- Children: 2
- Parent(s): John Quincy Adams; Louisa Adams
- Relatives: See Adams political family
- Education: Harvard University
- Profession: Businessman

John Adams II (July 4, 1803 – October 23, 1834) was an American government functionary and businessman. The second son of President John Quincy Adams and Louisa Adams, he is usually called John Adams II to distinguish him from President John Adams, his grandfather.

== Biography ==
John Adams II was born in Quincy, Massachusetts, on July 4, 1803.

He studied at Harvard College, but was expelled during his senior year for participating in the 1823 student rebellion, which protested against the curriculum and living conditions at the university. In 1873 most of the students who took part in the 1823 incident, including John Adams II, were designated "Bachelor of Arts as of 1823" and admitted to Harvard's Roll of Graduates.

Adams then studied law under his father, and when John Quincy Adams became president, his son served as his private secretary.

At a White House reception during the John Quincy Adams presidency, Russell Jarvis, an anti-Adams reporter for the Washington Daily Telegraph, believed that President Adams publicly insulted Mrs. Jarvis. Since the President was considered to be immune from a dueling challenge, Jarvis attempted to initiate a duel with John Adams II, who had been at the reception. Jarvis's effort to provoke an incident led to a highly publicized fistfight in the Capitol rotunda, with Jarvis pulling the hair and nose of and slapping Adams, and Adams refusing to retaliate. An investigating committee of the United States House of Representatives determined that Jarvis had initiated the attack, but took no other action. Louisa Adams always believed that the negative press generated by this incident, with John Adams II being accused of cowardice by newspaper editors who supported Andrew Jackson, led to Adams's early demise. The attack on Adams was the impetus for Congress to establish the United States Capitol Police, which provides security for Congressional buildings and grounds.

John Adams II, his older brother George and his younger brother Charles were all rivals for the same woman, their second cousin Mary Catherine Hellen, who lived with the John Quincy Adams family after the death of her parents. In 1828 John married Mary Hellen at a ceremony in the White House, and both his brothers refused to attend. John Adams II and Mary Hellen were the parents of two daughters, Mary Louisa (December 2, 1828 – July 16, 1859) and Georgiana Frances (September 10, 1830 – November 20, 1839).

== Death ==
After his father left the White House, John attempted a career in business, including operating a Washington flour mill owned by his father. His lack of success and despondency over his brother George's alcoholism and 1829 presumed suicide led to John's own descent into alcoholism. He died in Washington, D.C., on October 23, 1834, and is buried in Quincy's Hancock Cemetery.

Mary Hellen Adams continued to reside with John Quincy and Louisa Adams and helped care for them in their old age. She died in Bethlehem, New Hampshire, on August 31, 1870.

== Family tree ==
Adams family tree

John Adams (1735–1826)	Abigail Adams (née Smith) (1744–1818)
William Stephens Smith (1755–1816)	Abigail Amelia Adams Smith (1765–1813)	John Quincy Adams (1767–1848)	Louisa Catherine Adams (née Johnson) (1775–1852)	Charles Adams (1770–1800)	Thomas Boylston Adams (1772–1832)
George Washington Adams (1801–1829)	John Adams II (1803–1834)	Charles Francis Adams Sr. (1807–1886)	Abigail Brown Brooks (1808–1889)
Frances Cadwalader Crowninshield (1839–1911)	John Quincy Adams II (1833–1894)	Charles Francis Adams Jr. (1835–1915)	Henry Brooks Adams (1838–1918)	Marian Hooper Adams (1843–1885)	Peter Chardon Brooks Adams (1848–1927)
George Casper Adams (1863–1900)	Charles Francis Adams III (1866–1954)	Frances Adams (née Lovering) (1869–1956)	John Adams (1875–1964)
Henry Sturgis Morgan (1900–1982)	Catherine Lovering Adams Morgan (1902–1988)	Charles Francis Adams IV (1910–1999)	Thomas Boylston Adams (1910–1997)
