= Abigail Adams Smith =

Daughter of U.S. president John Adams

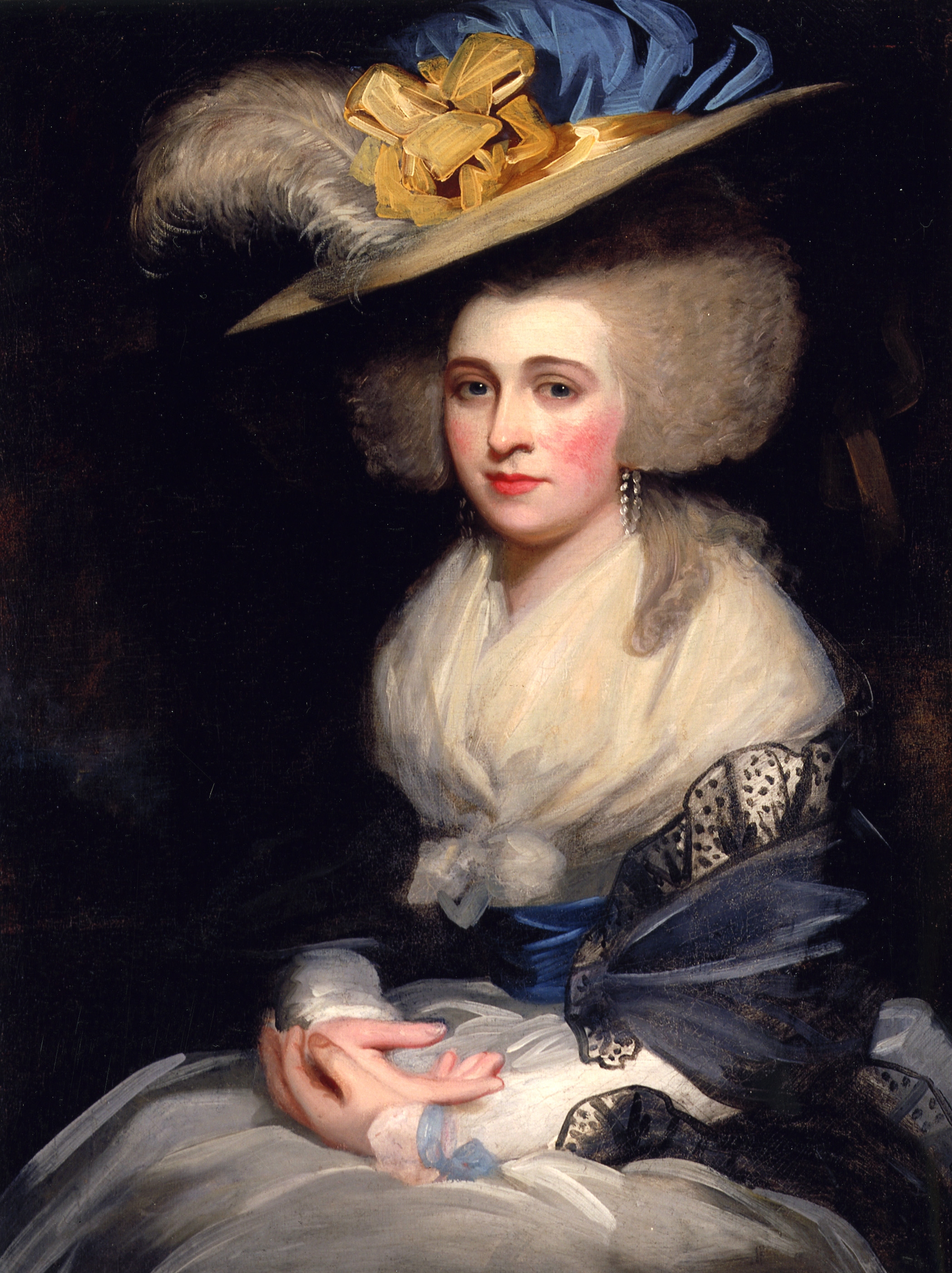
- Born: Abigail Adams; July 14, 1765; Braintree, Massachusetts Bay, British America
- Died: August 15, 1813 (aged 48); Quincy, Massachusetts, U.S.
- Burial place: Hancock Cemetery in Quincy, Massachusetts
- Spouse: William Stephens Smith (m. 1786)
- Children: 4
- Parent(s): John Adams; Abigail Smith
- Family: Adams, Quincy

Abigail Adams Smith (July 14, 1765 – August 15, 1813), nicknamed "Nabby", was a daughter of Abigail and John Adams, founding father and second President of the United States, and the older sister of John Quincy Adams, sixth President of the United States. She was named for her mother.

== Romance and marriage ==
Adams was born in Braintree, Massachusetts on July 14, 1765. She was the earliest born of any confirmed biological child to the President of the United States, and the first to be a part of the First Family in life. (Note: George Washington and Martha Custis had no children together, and all four children from Custis' first marriage had died before the presidency of George Washington. Thomas Posey (b. 1750) was well rumored to have been an illegitimate child of Washington, and if so, would precede Abigail Adams Smith.)

At the age of 18, she met and fell in love with Royall Tyler, who addressed her as "Amelia", a name she used with suitors. Her father thought she was too young to be courted, but he eventually accepted it. At one point the two were even engaged to be married. But John Adams, then the U.S. minister to the Kingdom of Great Britain, eagerly called for his wife and daughter to join him in London. For a time, Adams maintained a long-distance relationship with Tyler, but eventually broke off the engagement, leaving Tyler depressed.

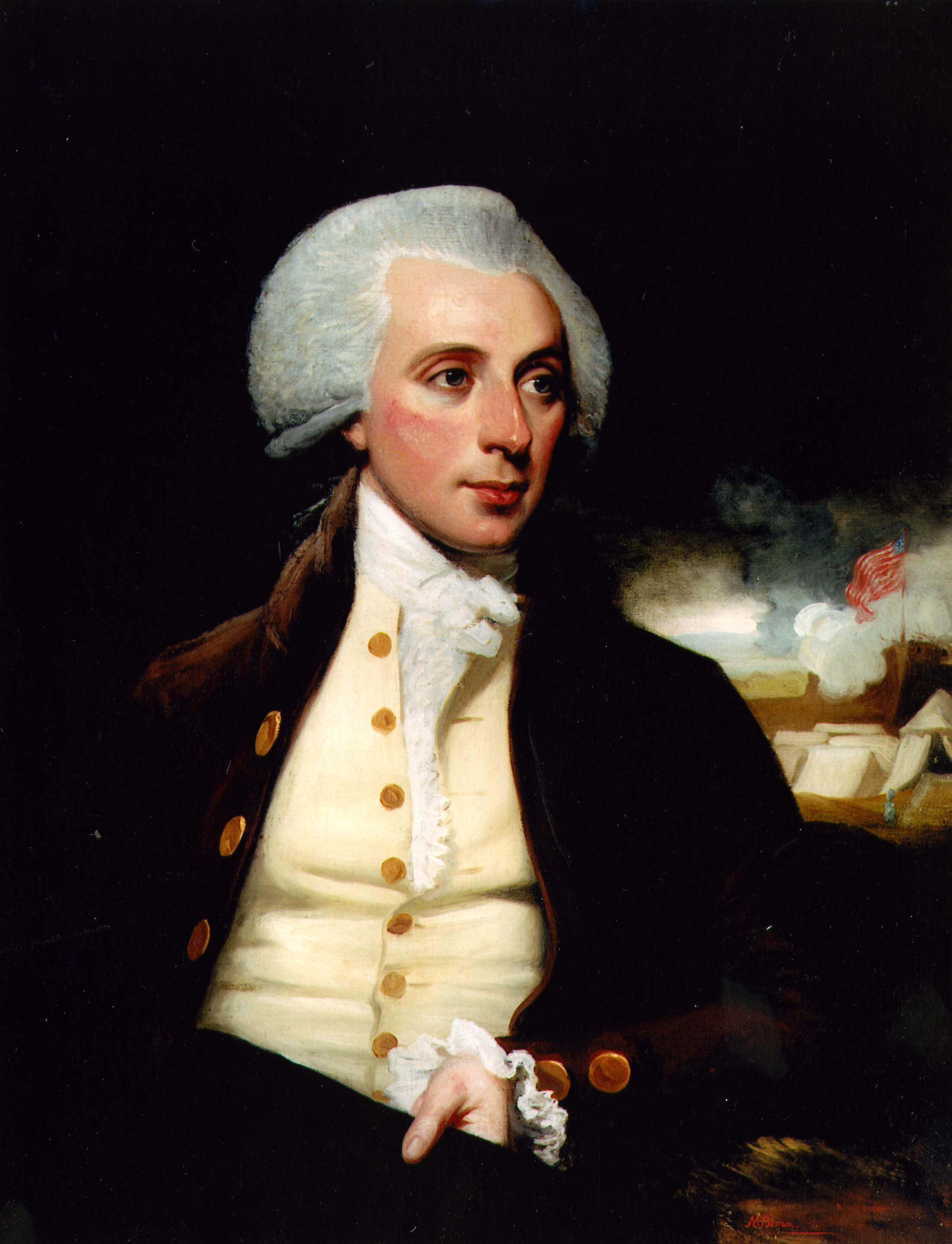
Portrait of William Stephen Smith by Mather Brown, c. 1786

Shortly afterward Adams met Colonel William Stephens Smith, who was serving as her father's secretary and was 10 years her senior. They would later be related by marriage—Col. Smith's sister was the wife of Adams's brother Charles. They were married at the American minister's residence in London on June 12, 1786. Adams's observations of European life and customs, and of many of the distinguished statesmen of the day, were later published.

Their courtship was thought to be too short by Adams's parents, and historians have not considered it to be a good marriage. While Colonel Smith was kind to his family, he never settled, continually seeking a better lot in life. He spent more money than he earned and lost everything to real estate speculation in the early 1800s. This left them on a small farm along the Chenango River in central New York.

Their children were:

- William Steuben Smith (1787–1850)
- John Adams Smith (1788–1854)
- Thomas Hollis Smith (1790–1791)
- Caroline Amelia Smith (1795–1852) married John Peter DeWindt of Fishkill-on-Hudson.

== Diagnosis of breast cancer ==
In 1810, Smith was diagnosed with breast cancer. On October 8, 1811, a mastectomy was performed by John Warren and several assistants without any anesthesia in an upstairs room of the Adams home. Her mother, husband, and daughter Caroline were also on hand to assist.

=== The surgery ===
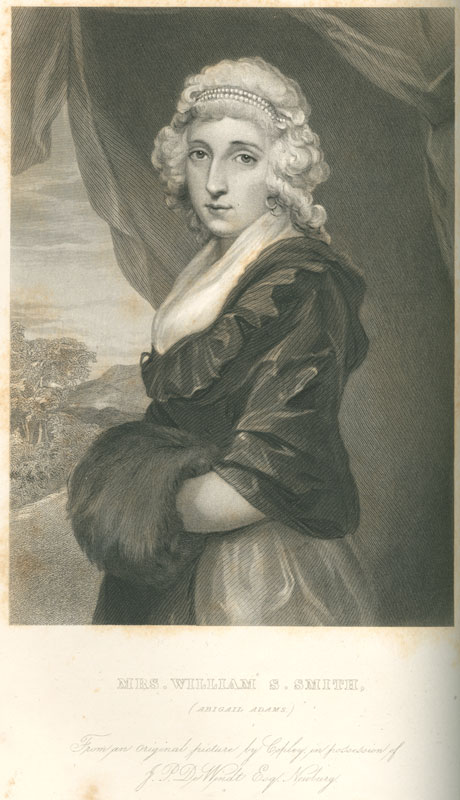
Abigail Adams Smith, after a portrait by John Singleton Copley

The exact details of the surgery are not known but it was described as a typical 19th-century operation. The instruments used during the surgery consisted of a large fork with a pair of six-inch prongs sharpened to a needle point, a wooden-handled razor, a small oven filled with heated coals, and a thick iron spatula. Before the surgery began Dr. Warren strapped Smith into a chair to restrain her, and then began to remove the clothing to expose the area on which he would operate. Once the diseased breast was exposed, other physicians held her left arm back so that Warren would have better access to the diseased tissue. He began the surgery by thrusting the large fork into her breast and lifting it from the chest wall. He then sliced at the base of the breast until it was completely severed from her chest. After removing the breast, he saw that the cancer had spread to the lymph nodes under Smith's arms, and he worked to remove those tumors as well. To stop Smith's bleeding, Warren applied the heated spatula to cauterize the open cuts, and then sutured the wounds. The surgery took around 25 minutes, and dressing the wounds took more than an hour. Warren and his assistants later expressed astonishment that Smith endured the pain of the surgery and cauterization without crying out, despite the gruesomeness of the operation, which was so horrifying it caused her mother, husband, and daughter to turn away.

== Death ==
In 1812, Smith finally started to feel well and returned to the family farm in New York. In early 1813, she began feeling pain in her abdomen and spine, as well as suffering from painful headaches. At first a local doctor in New York said that the pain was from rheumatism, but later that year new tumors began to appear in the scar tissue as well as on her skin. She then returned to Quincy, telling her husband that she preferred to die at her parents' home. She died on August 15, 1813, at the age of 48. (Note: Sources identify Smith's specific date of death as August 9, 14, or 15. August 15 is almost certainly correct. The earliest newspaper accounts of Smith's passing appeared on August 16. The death notice in the Independent Chronicle (Boston, MA) for Monday, August 16, 1813, specified that Smith died "yesterday" and that the funeral would be held "tomorrow".) She was buried at Hancock Cemetery in Quincy.

== Depictions in popular culture ==
Smith's death is a poignant part of the 2008 John Adams miniseries, in which she is played by Sarah Polley; Smith as a young girl was played by Madeline Taylor in the first three episodes of the same series. The series took artistic license by shifting Smith's cancer diagnosis to 1803, and changing many other aspects of her life.

== Family tree ==
Adams family tree

John Adams (1735–1826)	Abigail Adams (née Smith) (1744–1818)
William Stephens Smith (1755–1816)	Abigail Amelia Adams Smith (1765–1813)	John Quincy Adams (1767–1848)	Louisa Catherine Adams (née Johnson) (1775–1852)	Charles Adams (1770–1800)	Thomas Boylston Adams (1772–1832)
George Washington Adams (1801–1829)	John Adams II (1803–1834)	Charles Francis Adams Sr. (1807–1886)	Abigail Brown Brooks (1808–1889)
Frances Cadwalader Crowninshield (1839–1911)	John Quincy Adams II (1833–1894)	Charles Francis Adams Jr. (1835–1915)	Henry Brooks Adams (1838–1918)	Marian Hooper Adams (1843–1885)	Peter Chardon Brooks Adams (1848–1927)
George Casper Adams (1863–1900)	Charles Francis Adams III (1866–1954)	Frances Adams (née Lovering) (1869–1956)	John Adams (1875–1964)
Henry Sturgis Morgan (1900–1982)	Catherine Lovering Adams Morgan (1902–1988)	Charles Francis Adams IV (1910–1999)	Thomas Boylston Adams (1910–1997)

== See also ==
- Mount Vernon Hotel Museum, a building in Manhattan originally intended to become the Smiths' estate but not completed before the property was sold by them. In the 20th century, it was named the Abigail Adams Smith Museum by the Colonial Dames of America.
