= Charles Francis Adams III =

American politician (1866–1954)

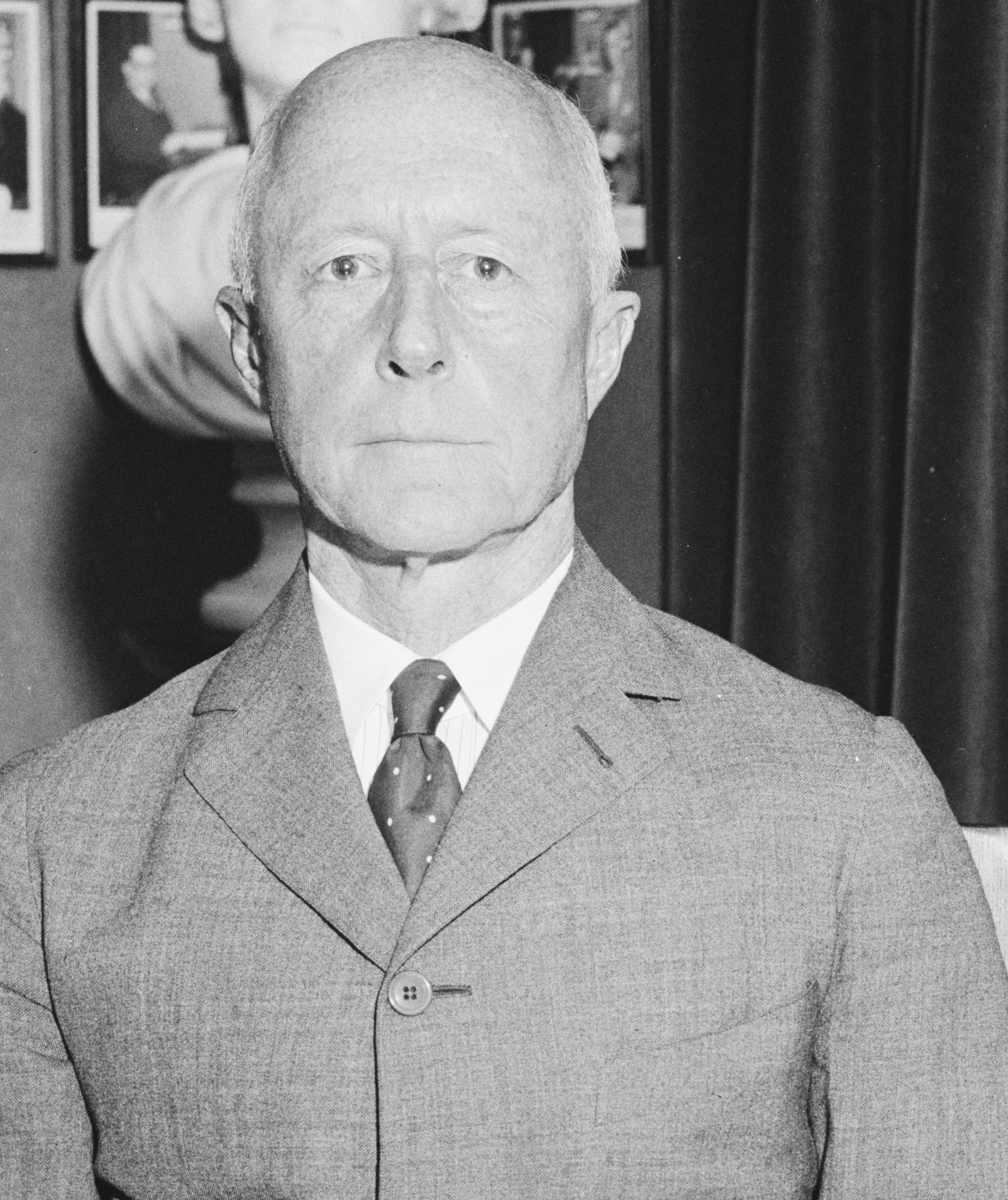
- Adams in 1931

44th United States Secretary of the Navy
- In office March 5, 1929 – March 4, 1933
- President: Herbert Hoover
- Preceded by: Curtis D. Wilbur
- Succeeded by: Claude A. Swanson

4th Mayor of Quincy
- In office 1896–1897
- Preceded by: William Hodges
- Succeeded by: Russell Adams Sears

Personal details
- Born: August 2, 1866 Quincy, Massachusetts, U.S.
- Died: June 10, 1954 (aged 87) Boston, Massachusetts, U.S.
- Party: Republican
- Spouse: Frances Lovering (m. 1899)
- Relations: Adams family
- Children: 2, including Charles IV
- Parent: John Quincy Adams II (father)
- Education: Harvard University (BA, LLB)

Charles Francis Adams III (August 2, 1866 – June 10, 1954) was an American lawyer and politician, who served as the 44th United States Secretary of the Navy under President Herbert Hoover from 1929 to 1933. He was the captain of the Resolute which won the 1920 America's Cup.

Adams graduated from Harvard College in 1888 and then Harvard Law School in 1892. After going from being a lawyer and then a businessman, he was elected mayor of Quincy in 1896 and unelected a year later. Adams married Frances Lovering in 1899 and they had 2 children. He proposed to the Congress in 1903 that the USS Constitution be restored. He was granted this wish in 1907 when they raised funds to make her open to the public again. Adams was an officer in 43 corporations at one point, including the Harvard Corporation. He then was appointed Secretary of the Navy in 1929. He promoted public understanding of the Navy's indispensable role in international affairs, and worked strenuously to maintain naval strength and efficiency during the Great Depression. In 1930, he successfully maintained the principle of United States' naval parity with Britain while serving at the London Naval Treaty. He retired from his position in 1933.

== Early life ==
Charles Francis Adams III was born on August 2, 1866, in Quincy, Massachusetts, to Frances "Fanny" Cadwalader Crowninshield and John Quincy Adams II.

Adams graduated cum laude from Harvard College in 1888, where he was a brother of the Delta Kappa Epsilon fraternity (Alpha chapter). He later graduated from Harvard Law School in 1892.

== Career ==
After graduating from Harvard Law and being admitted to the bar in 1893, he was first a lawyer, then went into business. From 1896 to 1897, Adams served as mayor of Quincy, Massachusetts.

In 1903, while serving as president of the Massachusetts Historical Society, Adams proposed to Congress that the famed frigate USS Constitution be restored and returned to active service. This led to Congress authorizing funds for the restoration of Constitution and opening her to the public in 1907.

In 1916, the Massachusetts legislature and electorate approved a calling of a constitutional convention. Adams was elected as a delegate at large to serve as a member of the Massachusetts Constitutional Convention of 1917.

At one time, he was an officer in 43 corporations, including several banks and many of the country's largest corporations such as the New York, New Haven and Hartford Railroad, the Union Pacific Railroad, and the Harvard Corporation.

=== Secretary of the Navy ===
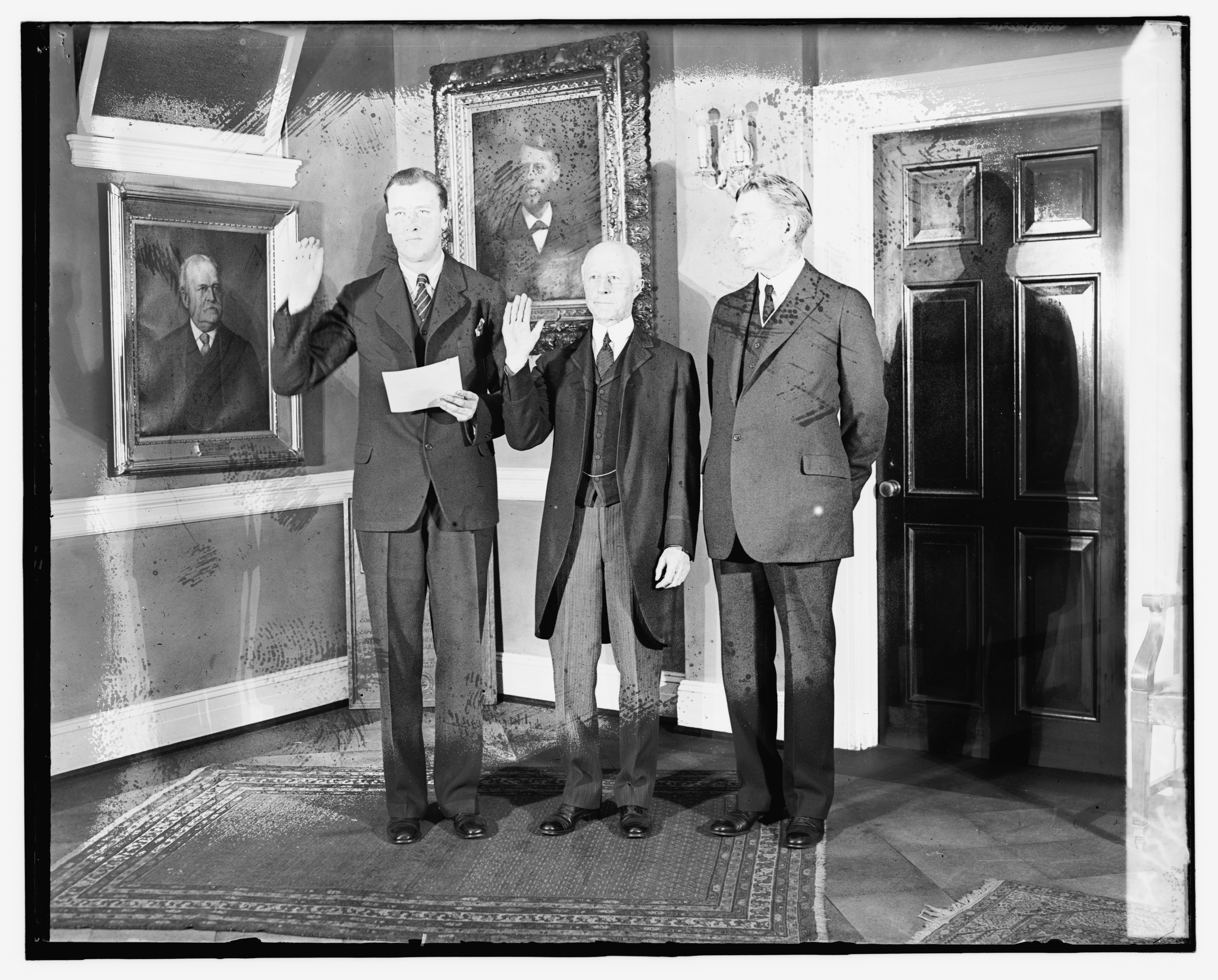
Adams taking oath

Adams was appointed Secretary of the Navy on March 5, 1929, by President Herbert Hoover. He vigorously promoted public understanding of the Navy's indispensable role in international affairs, and worked strenuously to maintain naval strength and efficiency during the Great Depression. He served at the London Naval Treaty in 1930 where he successfully maintained the principle of United States naval parity with Britain. In his memoirs, Hoover noted that, had he known Adams at the start of his presidency as well as he did at its end, he would have named Adams his Secretary of State. Adams retired from his position on March 4, 1933.

Adams was a supporter of limited presidential terms, well before the Twenty-second Amendment to the United States Constitution passed, and advocated that the Presidents should be required to renounce political parties and that after they left the presidency, should be made ex-officio members of the United States Senate.

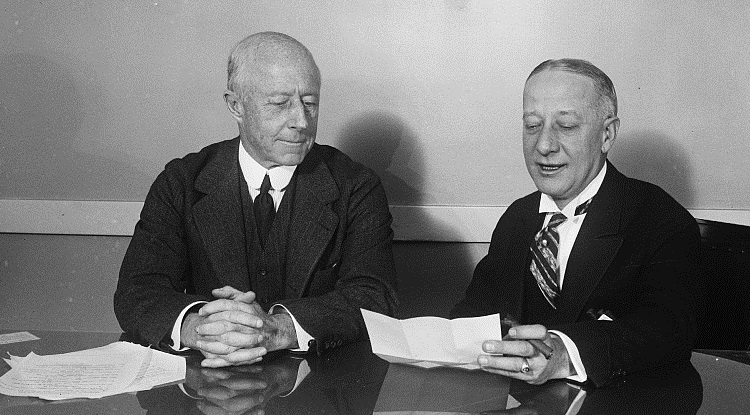
Former New York Governor Al Smith (right) asking for help of Navy engineers in the construction of the Empire State Building

=== Activities and interests ===
In 1920, Adams skippered the America's Cup defender Resolute and soon became known as the "Dean of American Helmsmen". He was posthumously inducted into the America's Cup Hall of Fame in 1993. In 1939, he won the King's Cup, Astor Cup, and Puritan Cup, the three most coveted domestic yachting trophies in a single season.

In 1929, Adams became a member of the District of Columbia Society of the Sons of the American Revolution. His national membership number was 48,952. He was also an honorary companion of the Naval Order of the United States. In 1932, he was elected a Fellow of the American Academy of Arts and Sciences.

== Personal life ==
=== Family ===
A scion of the Adams family that produced two presidents, Adams, a son of John Quincy Adams II, the oldest son of the Charles Francis Adams Sr., was a great-grandson of the sixth U. S. President John Quincy Adams, and a great-great-grandson of the second U.S. President John Adams. His mother Fanny Crowninshield was the granddaughter of U.S. Secretary of the Navy Benjamin Williams Crowninshield. Adams was also the third cousin twice removed of Otis Norcross, the 19th Mayor of Boston. Both descending from their fourth great-grandfather, Joseph Adams; Otis from his first wife Mary [Chapin], and Charles from his second wife Hannah [Bass].

Charles Francis Adams Jr. was an uncle of Charles Francis Adams III, not his father as regularly assumed by virtue of sequential name succession. Charles Jr. had five children, the first three being daughters, which may explain why his brother John Q. Adams II took the prerogative to name his firstborn son after his brother. Charles Jr.'s only sons (twins) were born in 1875.

=== Marriage and children ===
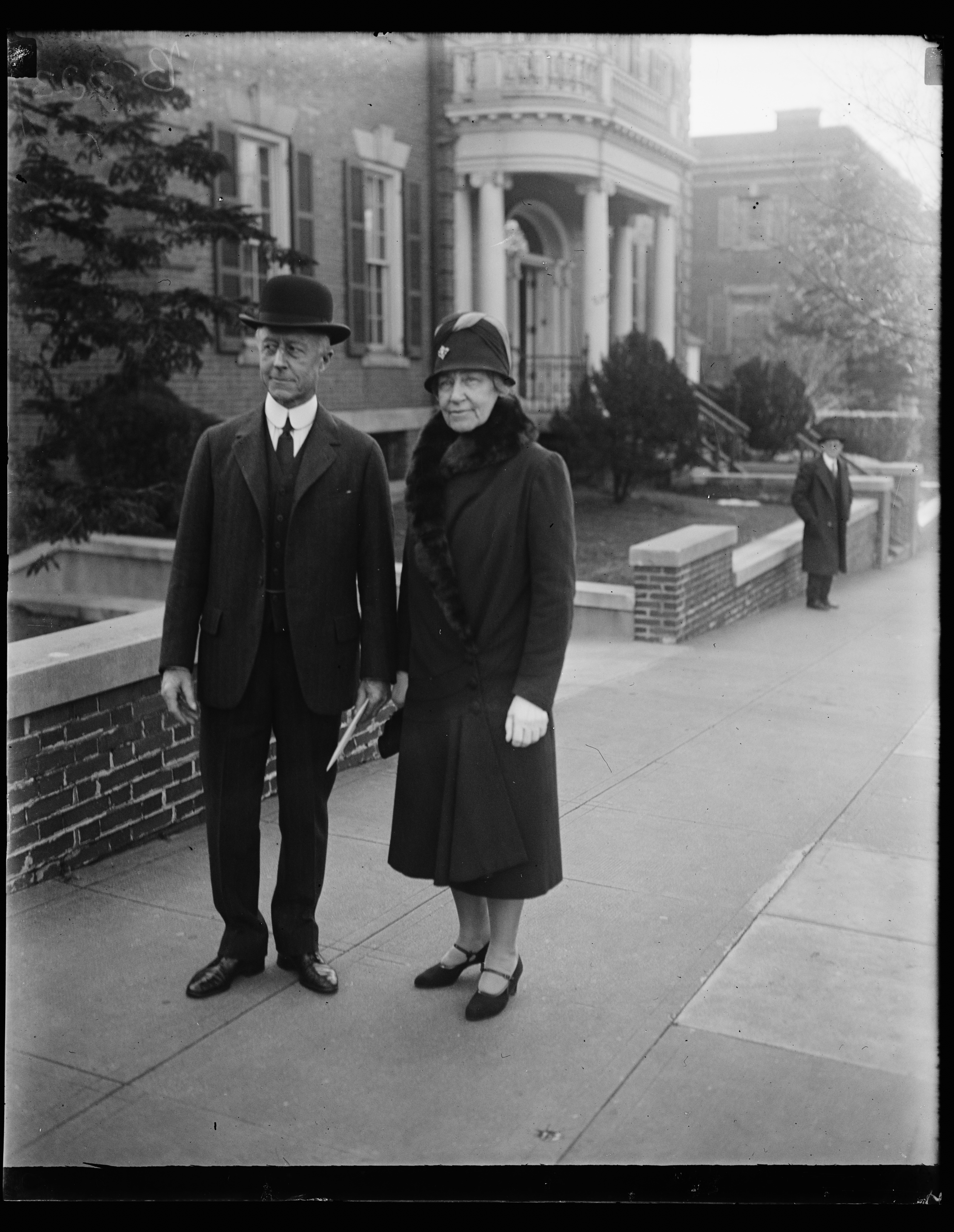
Adams and Frances in 1929

On April 3, 1899, Adams married Frances Lovering (d. 1956), the daughter of U.S. Representative William C. Lovering (1835–1910), at St. John's Episcopal Church in Washington, D.C. Together, they had two children:

- Catherine Frances Lovering Adams in 1902, who married Henry Sturgis Morgan, son of J. P. Morgan, Jr. and Jane Norton Grew and one of the founders of Morgan Stanley (1935), along with Harold Stanley, on June 26, 1923. Together, they had five sons.
- Charles Francis Adams IV in 1910, who was a prominent businessman and the first president of Raytheon Company, was married firstly to Margaret [Stockton]. Their children were: Abigail Adams, Allison Adams, Charles Francis Adams V, and Timothy Adams. He married secondly, widow Mrs. Beatrice D. Penati, who had a son named Giannotto Penati.

Adams died on June 11, 1954, and was interred in Mount Wollaston Cemetery in Quincy, Massachusetts, on June 13, 1954. His estate, valued at $192,000 in 1954, was left to his widow.

In 1899, Adams built his family home and estate on land in Concord, Massachusetts formerly owned by his uncle, Charles Francis Adams Jr. The home, known as Mt. Vernon, stood for 120 years until it was destroyed by fire shortly after Christmas Day 2019.

=== Honors ===
The Charles Francis Adams Memorial Trophy for yacht racing was established in his memory, and the Navy destroyer USS Charles F. Adams was dedicated in his honor.

== Family tree ==
=== Paternal side ===
Adams family tree

John Adams (1735–1826)	Abigail Adams (née Smith) (1744–1818)
William Stephens Smith (1755–1816)	Abigail Amelia Adams Smith (1765–1813)	John Quincy Adams (1767–1848)	Louisa Catherine Adams (née Johnson) (1775–1852)	Charles Adams (1770–1800)	Thomas Boylston Adams (1772–1832)
George Washington Adams (1801–1829)	John Adams II (1803–1834)	Charles Francis Adams Sr. (1807–1886)	Abigail Brown Brooks (1808–1889)
Frances Cadwalader Crowninshield (1839–1911)	John Quincy Adams II (1833–1894)	Charles Francis Adams Jr. (1835–1915)	Henry Brooks Adams (1838–1918)	Marian Hooper Adams (1843–1885)	Peter Chardon Brooks Adams (1848–1927)
George Casper Adams (1863–1900)	Charles Francis Adams III (1866–1954)	Frances Adams (née Lovering) (1869–1956)	John Adams (1875–1964)
Henry Sturgis Morgan (1900–1982)	Catherine Lovering Adams Morgan (1902–1988)	Charles Francis Adams IV (1910–1999)	Thomas Boylston Adams (1910–1997)

=== Maternal side ===
Crowninshield-Bradlee family tree

Benjamin Williams Crowninshield (1772–1851)
Francis Boardman Crowninshield (1809–1877)	Jonathan Mason Warren (1811–1867)	Annie G. Crowninshield (1815–1905)	Edward A. Crowninshield (1817–1859)	George Casper Crowninshield (1810–1857)
Benjamin W. Crowninshield (1837–1892)	Alice Crowninshield (1839–1902)	Josiah Bradlee III (1837–1902)	Frederic Crowninshield (1845–1918)	Caspar Crowninshield (1837–1897)	Fanny Crowninshield (1839–1911)	John Quincy Adams II (1833–1894)
B.B. Crowninshield (1867–1948)	Frederick Josiah Bradlee Sr. (1866–1951)	Helen Suzette Crowninshield (1868–1941)	Frank Crowninshield (1872–1947)	Harriet Sears Crowninshield (1869–1905)	George Caspar Adams (1863–1900)	Charles Francis Adams III (1866–1954)
Frederick Josiah Bradlee Jr. (1892–1970)	Josephine de Gersdorff (1896–1975)	Constance Crowninshield Coolidge (1892–1973)	Ray Atherton (1883–1960)
Jean Saltonstall (1921–2011)	Ben Bradlee (1921–2014)	Sally Quinn (1941–)
Martha Raddatz (1953–)	Benjamin Bradlee Jr. (1948–)	Quinn Bradlee (1982–)

Notes:

Government offices
Preceded by Curtis D. Wilbur	United States Secretary of the Navy; March 5, 1929 – March 4, 1933	Succeeded by Claude A. Swanson
