= Thomas Boylston Adams (judge) =

Youngest son of John Adams (1772–1832)

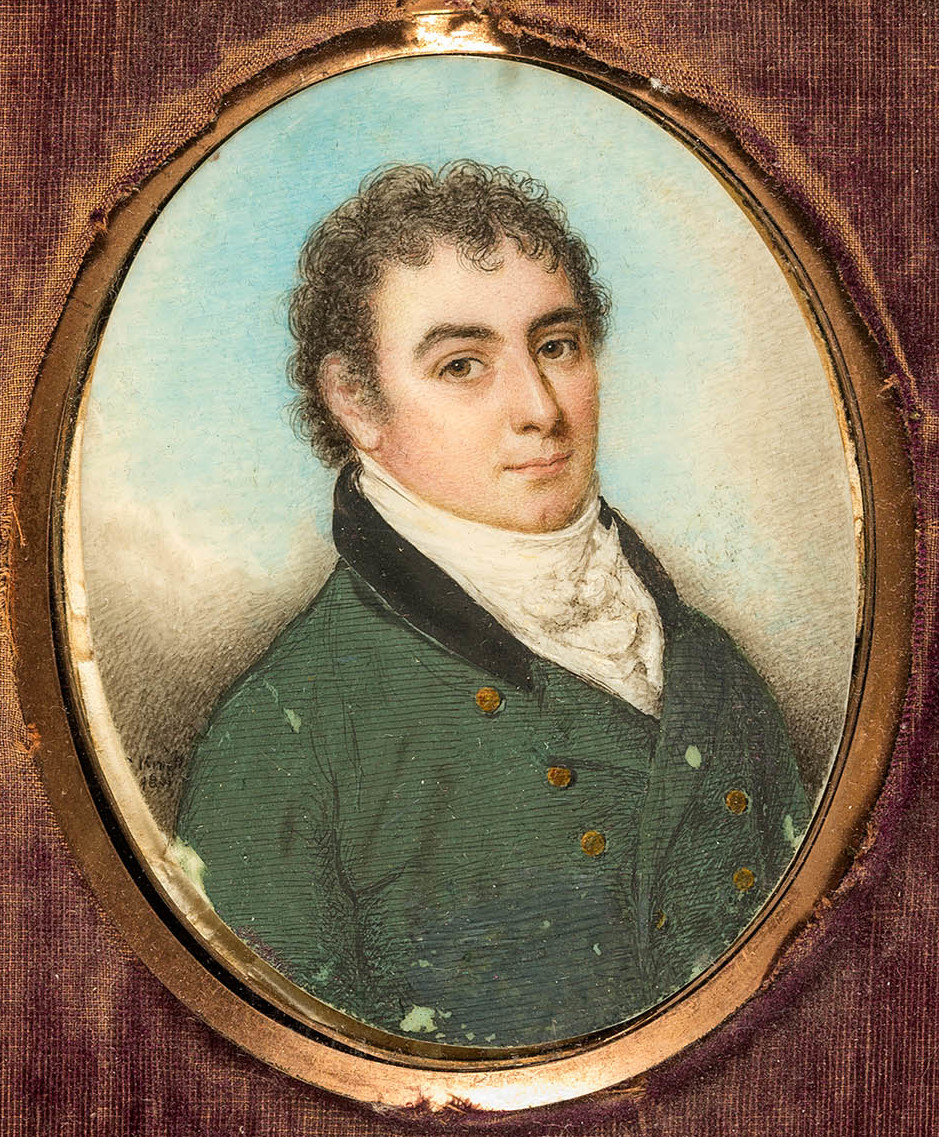
- Portrait miniature, c. 1815

Chief Justice of Circuit Court of Common Pleas for the Southern Circuit of Massachusetts
- In office 1811–1812

Personal details
- Born: September 15, 1772 Braintree, Massachusetts Bay, British America
- Died: March 13, 1832 (aged 59) Quincy, Massachusetts, U.S.
- Resting place: Mount Wollaston Cemetery, Quincy, Massachusetts
- Spouse: Ann Harrod (m. 1805)
- Relations: See Adams family
- Children: Abigail Smith Adams; Elizabeth Coombs Adams; Thomas Boylston Adams; Frances Foster Adams; Isaac Hull Adams; John Quincy Adams; Joseph Harrod Adams
- Parent(s): John Adams; Abigail Smith Adams
- Education: Harvard College

Thomas Boylston Adams (September 15, 1772 – March 12, 1832) was the third and youngest son of second United States president John Adams and Abigail (Smith) Adams. He worked as a lawyer, a secretary to his brother John Quincy Adams while the latter served as United States ambassador to the Netherlands and Prussia, the business manager of and a contributor to the political and literary journal Port Folio, and a Massachusetts chief justice.

== Early life ==
Adams was born on September 15, 1772, to John and Abigail Adams, in Braintree, Massachusetts. His parents' youngest surviving child, he joined three older siblings: Abigail (Nabby), John Quincy, and Charles. Thomas was named for his paternal great-great-grandfather, physician Thomas Boylston.

Thomas's early childhood, spent primarily on the family farm in Braintree, was marked by the uncertainty and upheaval of the American Revolution. John Adams's frequent absence, while he participated in the Continental Congress, caused his youngest child great emotional distress. Abigail reported to her husband that Thomas often stood beside her while she wrote letters to John, asking his mother to "send duty" and expressing how he "longs to see Pappa." At three years old, Thomas told his mother and siblings that he believed his father would not "come home till the Battle is over." On one occasion, John sent letters to his three eldest children but, since the boy could not yet read, neglected to write Thomas. His mother revealed that the four-year-old "stood in silent grief with the Tears running down his face," insisting that "Pappa does not Love him he says so well as he does Brothers."

In the summer of 1776, Abigail Adams decided that three-year-old Thomas, along with his siblings, should be inoculated for smallpox. At age four, he wanted to be a soldier, prompting his father to write him and suggest he, like his great-great-grandfather and namesake, become a physician instead.

Like his siblings, Thomas was well-educated, and his parents expected him and his two older brothers to attend Harvard University. When he was eleven years old, his mother and older sister traveled to Europe to join John, who was serving as a United States foreign minister, and John Quincy, who had accompanied him. Charles and Thomas were sent to live with their aunt and uncle, their mother's sister Elizabeth Smith Shaw and her husband John, where the boys prepared for Harvard. Thomas spent much of his time studying Latin and caring for his pet doves. He struggled emotionally with his parents' absence, not wanting to return to the home of his childhood without them and often declining to write them letters. His parents returned when he was fifteen, by which time his mother had not seen him in four years, and his father in nine.

Thomas was admitted to the freshman class at Harvard in the fall of 1786. Though both his Aunt Shaw and his brother John Quincy had harbored concerns that he was still too young to attend, he proved a diligent student who impressed his family. In the entirety of his career at Harvard, he was punished once for the minor offense of missing prayers. He was assigned parts in class exhibitions and commencement, graduating in 1790.

== Career ==
Portrait miniature, c. 1795

After his graduation from Harvard, Thomas studied in the law office of Jared Ingersoll in Philadelphia as an apprentice. His examination for the bar took place in late 1793, and thereafter he remained in the city to work as a lawyer. In correspondence to his family, he documented the yellow fever epidemic of 1793, and even had to flee Philadelphia for New Jersey in October to escape the spread of the disease. He returned in late November to find several acquaintances afflicted or dead.

In the summer of 1793, John Quincy Adams was appointed the United States foreign minister to the Netherlands by President George Washington. John Quincy was eager for his youngest brother to accompany him as his secretary and requested that their father approve of such an arrangement. Thomas agreed, but, on his twenty-second birthday, confided in his diary that he bore some anxiety, as the journey was "such an alteration of my prospects in the line of my profession" at a time when his law career had just begun.

Thomas made an excellent secretary to John Quincy, who described the younger Adams as "my constant companion" to whom he could communicate everything "with the most unlimited confidence." Thomas remained with his brother for the duration of his work in the Netherlands, accompanied him on multiple diplomatic trips to England, and continued on with John Quincy when the latter was appointed minister to Prussia by their father, by now the second president of the United States.

While in Europe, Thomas used his diary to comment on political events of the day, including the entrance of Napoleon's French troops to the Hague in Holland. He witnessed an army of "about 2,000 in number" march into the city, which had already surrendered, noting that the soldiers all appeared "below the ordinary stature, all young" and that "hardihood was the only distinguishable mark upon their Countenance." He also attended the ceremony which announced the new Batavian Republic on March 1, 1796, reflecting that this "new form of Government cannot be for the publick a greater calamity than the continuance of the Old-régime" in Holland. When he was not busy attending diplomatic events and performing secretarial duties, Thomas spent much of his time in Europe dancing at social balls, visiting the theatre, and ice-skating, his preferred form of exercise at which he was quite skilled.

In the autumn of 1798, Thomas left John Quincy and his wife Louisa Catherine Adams to return to the United States. He decided to reopen his law practice, though John Quincy wrote to their mother that he wished Thomas would choose other employment, believing the youngest Adams's "inclination [not] ... suited to the contentious part of that profession." John Quincy applauded the skills his youngest brother had learned while in Europe, writing that Thomas had learned French, German, and Dutch in varying degrees, gained knowledge of the political climate in numerous European countries, and secured the art of negotiation. John Quincy continued to correspond with Thomas at length about affairs in Europe as long as he remained there.

Thomas returned to Philadelphia in April 1799 to continue practicing law, but was often frustrated by his lack of success. He wrote to his father that he felt his "want of experience, & long discontinuance from the language & practice of the bar, in addition to a pretty strong natural want of confidence in myself" combined to guarantee his failure.

In the late days of John Adams's presidency, Thomas wrote essays for publication in Philadelphia newspapers, under the pseudonyms Plutarch, Mutius Scævola, A Friend to His Country, and Fabius, to defend his father's policies as president against opposition newspapers. He argued against accusations that his father favored monarchies, defended the decision to seek peace with France, and supported the provision under the Convention of 1800 that American and French ships could enter each other's ports without paying duties. In these essays, Thomas employed his knowledge of European political relations as well as his legal expertise.

At this time, Thomas became reacquainted with Joseph Dennie Jr., a classmate from Harvard, who had moved to Philadelphia and founded a literary and political journal entitled Port Folio. Over the next several years, Thomas became a sporadic contributor to the journal, writing primarily Federalist political articles that were published in a section called "Miscellaneous Paragraphs." He wrote on such subjects as the folly of establishing the national capital in Washington, D.C., to conciliate the Southern states, the rumors that his father wanted the United States to adopt a hereditary government, and the latest publications of political thinker and Adams family nemesis Thomas Paine. More often, however, Thomas was publishing the works of his older brother John Quincy within the journal's pages, though both brothers’ writings were always included anonymously due to the perception that a literary career made a man ineligible for public service.

In the fall of 1802, due to Dennie's careless business style, Thomas became the business manager of the Port Folio. He believed that his tasks as John Quincy's secretary had amply prepared him for this type of work, and asked his older brother to aid him only by continuing to supply his "pen-service." Due to some personal issues with and questionable political decisions made by Dennie, the Adams brothers ceased to contribute to the Port Folio by 1805.

Thomas moved back home to Quincy, Massachusetts, where he was admitted to the bar in the spring of 1804. In August 1806, he returned to Harvard University to deliver the Phi Beta Kappa oration, choosing "Philosophy" as his subject. He was elected a member of the American Academy of Arts and Sciences, where his brother John Quincy was the corresponding secretary, in 1810.

On the possibility of political service, Thomas wrote his cousin William Cranch in 1799 that though he was "ashamed of myself for not being so great a politician as you are," he found politics to be a "remote branch of my trade" toward which he felt "some listlessness." Yet he did in time pursue politics, holding several offices for the town of Quincy, including Treasurer from 1804 to 1805 and supervisor of schools from 1807 to 1811. While Thomas was on the Massachusetts General Court from 1805 to 1806, John Quincy, then a United States Senator, encouraged him to introduce certain resolutions and to "bring [him]self forward to the public eye," believing Thomas could be a great asset to their country. Thomas served as a representative on the Massachusetts legislature from 1809 to 1811, where he was appointed a member of the Executive Council in June of his final year.

In April 1811, Thomas and two others were commissioned by the Massachusetts governor to investigate disturbances in Lincoln County, Maine, arising from land claim disagreements. Recent violent clashes between proprietors and tenants led a committee in the town of Bristol, Maine, to order a land survey, which only made residents angrier, and Thomas and his fellow commissioners were brought in to conduct a thorough investigation and present advice to the legislature. Ultimately, the "commissioners performed their duty in a way...satisfactory to all concerned," finding that the land claims were so old and convoluted that it was no wonder the tenants had revolted, and the proprietors were bought out with equivalent land tracts elsewhere in the Commonwealth while the settlers were given deeds of release.

In June of the same year, Thomas was appointed chief justice of the Circuit Court of Common Pleas for the Southern Circuit of Massachusetts. In 1812, he was chosen by delegates from Massachusetts's Norfolk Congressional District to serve as meeting chairman while they selected a candidate to represent them in Congress.

Thomas's increasing struggles with alcohol addiction around and after this time made it difficult for him to continue pursuing his career. He and his large family often made their home with his parents, and relied on them and his brother John Quincy financially.

== Personal life ==
Thomas Boylston Adams was described by relatives and acquaintances as intelligent and good-tempered. His older sister Nabby told John Quincy that ten-year-old Thomas was "something of a rogue." While he lived with his aunt Elizabeth Smith Shaw, the woman grew quite attached to the boy, whom she described as "an exceeding good Child" with "such a pleasant Temper," and an "innocently playful" teenager with an "intrepid Spirit."

Thomas' sister-in-law Louisa Catherine Adams, wife of John Quincy, referred to Thomas as her "kind brother" who "respected and loved me, and did me justice in times when I needed a powerful friend," claiming that she "never saw so fine a temper, or so truly and invariably lovely a disposition." John Adams was impressed by his adult son's "Understanding Discretion and benevolence." Yet Thomas' issues with alcoholism in his later years considerably shifted his personality, and his nephew Charles Francis Adams described him in 1824 as "one of the most unpleasant characters in this world, in his present degradation."

Thomas had close relationships with his three older siblings. His sister Nabby wrote from Europe to their cousin Lucy Cranch that "I regret my seperation [sic] from my Brothers more than any other Circumstance ..." When John Quincy and Thomas received the first letters from family during their time in Holland, Thomas recorded in his diary that "my Sister [was] the only one that wrote me."

Upon returning to the United States, Thomas traveled several times to New York to visit Nabby, once taking to his diary after an evening at her home to note he "never pass[ed] a happy hour" in the presence of her husband, William Stephens Smith, and mourned protectively that "my dear Sister's destiny might have been happier." When Nabby stayed with him in Philadelphia in November 1799, Thomas wrote his cousin William Cranch that her presence made "my domestic intercourse abundantly delightful."

When he was thirteen, his aunt Shaw wrote to her sister Abigail that Thomas and his brothers, John Quincy and Charles, had "chose to lodge together in our great Bed," and noted her happiness at seeing her nephews' "Love, Innocence, Health and Peace." While at Harvard, Charles and Thomas often traveled to Haverhill together to visit their aunt and uncle on vacations, and to Newburyport, Massachusetts, where John Quincy was completing his law apprenticeship. When Thomas moved to Philadelphia for his own work, Charles wrote to their older brother that "I shall miss Tom much."

In April 1799, Thomas attended a performance of The Italian Father with Charles in New York, calling the play about adultery and immorality "an affecting piece" that he "felt...the stronger" by being with his brother, whose marital infidelity, financial problems, and struggles with alcohol addiction were, at this point, becoming known by the family. When Charles, renounced by his father and separated from his wife and children, died in 1800, Thomas broke the news to John Quincy by describing Charles’ death as a long-foreseen "catastrophe, which it was not in human power to avert." He concluded the letter by asking that "silence reign forever over his tomb."

Thomas met Ann Harrod (often called Nancy), his future wife, when he was a child living in Haverhill with his aunt Elizabeth Smith Shaw. Shaw encouraged a friendship between her nephew and young neighbor, and Thomas later recalled that he had loved her ever since. In 1794, he told his cousin William Cranch that he wore a broach as a "constant memento" of this "Friend of my younger days."

While in Europe, Thomas wrote of his interest in several young women in his diary, even pursuing an affair with the wife of an Englishman who had a jeweler's shop in Holland. Upon returning to the United States, however, he reconnected with Ann Harrod. Their courtship was lengthy, sporadic, and secretive, and his aunt expressed concern "that to continue a correspondence of this nature, in a Clandestine way was what parents might consider undutiful." Yet Abigail Adams approved of the match, telling her son that Ann was "a very Amiable girl" who was "as well calculated to make what I call a good wife, as any one," and in 1805, the pair married.

In just eleven years, Thomas and Ann had seven children: Abigail Smith, Elizabeth Coombs, Thomas Boylston, Frances Foster (died in infancy), Isaac Hull, John Quincy, and Joseph Harrod. Thomas wrote of his great joy at becoming a father after Abigail Smith's birth, revealing in a letter to a friend that "I know what it is to be a father, and am not amid the joys of this new title, unconscious of the additional weight of duty, which necessarily attends it." During their early years, their mother Ann kept a diary to record their childhood illnesses, as well as first words, first steps, and other milestones.

Tragically, on his 40th birthday, Thomas's baby niece Louisa Catherine Adams Jr died of dysentery and a fever while with her parents and brother, Charles Frances Adams, were in St. Petersberg, Russia, soon after he lost his baby daughter Frances Foster Adams of an unknown cause back in Massachusetts. The Adamses were devastated, though it is currently unknown what Thomas thought of the loss of the baby.

Thomas’ nephew Charles Francis observed that the children "appear[ed] considerably affected by" their father's alcoholism and resulting cruelty, writing that he was "sorry for the Children because this is the punishment occasioned by the fault of the father." Three of Thomas's sons died in military service. Elizabeth Coombs, a dedicated keeper of her famous family's memory, lived in Washington, D.C., with her uncle John Quincy during much of his presidency, and died the oldest resident in Quincy, Massachusetts at the age of 95 in 1903.

Thomas was plagued by rheumatism throughout his life, beginning when he was just a child. Abigail Adams recalled that she had suffered similar bouts of pain in her young years. On numerous occasions while working for his brother in Europe, Thomas recorded in his diary that he was too weak to leave the house on account of this condition, sometimes managing to take long walks in attempts to rid himself of pain.

Like his maternal uncle William Smith and his brother Charles before him, Thomas developed a severe and persistent alcohol addiction, putting a major strain on his relationships with his family. In September 1819, he disappeared after an argument with his father, leaving his wife, children, and possessions behind. He did not return until five days later, "much fatigued and unwell," and was not reconciled to his father until John Quincy facilitated peace between the pair. John Quincy's son Charles Francis described his uncle under the effect of alcohol as "extremely disgusting ... a brute in his manners and a bully in his family."

Thomas also experienced difficulty with his mental health, undergoing periods of depression which he referred to in his diary and letters as "the Blue Devils," a contemporary slang term for severe melancholy.

In his later years, Thomas accumulated significant debt, relying primarily on his brother John Quincy to provide for his family. John Quincy expressed concern that his brother's financial problems may be the result of gambling; Charles Francis believed his uncle to be "a Slave to ... company," too eager to entertain friends on "his limited income." Upon John Adams's death, the money for his youngest son was placed in a trust, which Thomas received in periodic allowances. John Quincy Adams exercised great patience with his brother and continued to provide financially for him throughout his life, which John Quincy described simply as his "brotherly duty of kindness."

On March 12, 1832, Thomas died in Quincy, Massachusetts at the age of fifty-nine, in the presence of his wife and children. Charles Francis Adams wrote in his diary the following day that his uncle "paid a bitter penance for his follies and left his Children to share the same as his only legacy." John Quincy Adams, upon receiving word of Thomas's death, took to his journal to mourn "my dear and amiable brother."

Thomas is buried in the Mount Wollaston Cemetery in Quincy alongside his wife and children.

== In popular culture ==
Thomas makes brief appearances in the 1976 PBS miniseries The Adams Chronicles, which spans five generations of Adams family history. He is played by Tom Tammi and Richard Mathews.

HBO's 2008 miniseries John Adams features Thomas in a more prominent role. He is portrayed in childhood by Carter Godwin and Thomas Langston, and by Samuel Barnett as an adult. The series depicts Thomas as an amiable and dutiful son who wins his father's approval as John Quincy's secretary, cares for his parents in their old age, and looks after his widowed sister-in-law Sally and her children.

The musical 1776 bears fleeting references to Thomas in his early childhood. His mother Abigail writes in letters of his "turning blue" and getting the measles to convince her husband John to come home from the Continental Congress.

== Family tree ==
Adams family tree

John Adams (1735–1826)	Abigail Adams (née Smith) (1744–1818)
William Stephens Smith (1755–1816)	Abigail Amelia Adams Smith (1765–1813)	John Quincy Adams (1767–1848)	Louisa Catherine Adams (née Johnson) (1775–1852)	Charles Adams (1770–1800)	Thomas Boylston Adams (1772–1832)
George Washington Adams (1801–1829)	John Adams II (1803–1834)	Charles Francis Adams Sr. (1807–1886)	Abigail Brown Brooks (1808–1889)
Frances Cadwalader Crowninshield (1839–1911)	John Quincy Adams II (1833–1894)	Charles Francis Adams Jr. (1835–1915)	Henry Brooks Adams (1838–1918)	Marian Hooper Adams (1843–1885)	Peter Chardon Brooks Adams (1848–1927)
George Casper Adams (1863–1900)	Charles Francis Adams III (1866–1954)	Frances Adams (née Lovering) (1869–1956)	John Adams (1875–1964)
Henry Sturgis Morgan (1900–1982)	Catherine Lovering Adams Morgan (1902–1988)	Charles Francis Adams IV (1910–1999)	Thomas Boylston Adams (1910–1997)
