= William Stephens Smith =

US Representative, Son-in-Law of John Adams

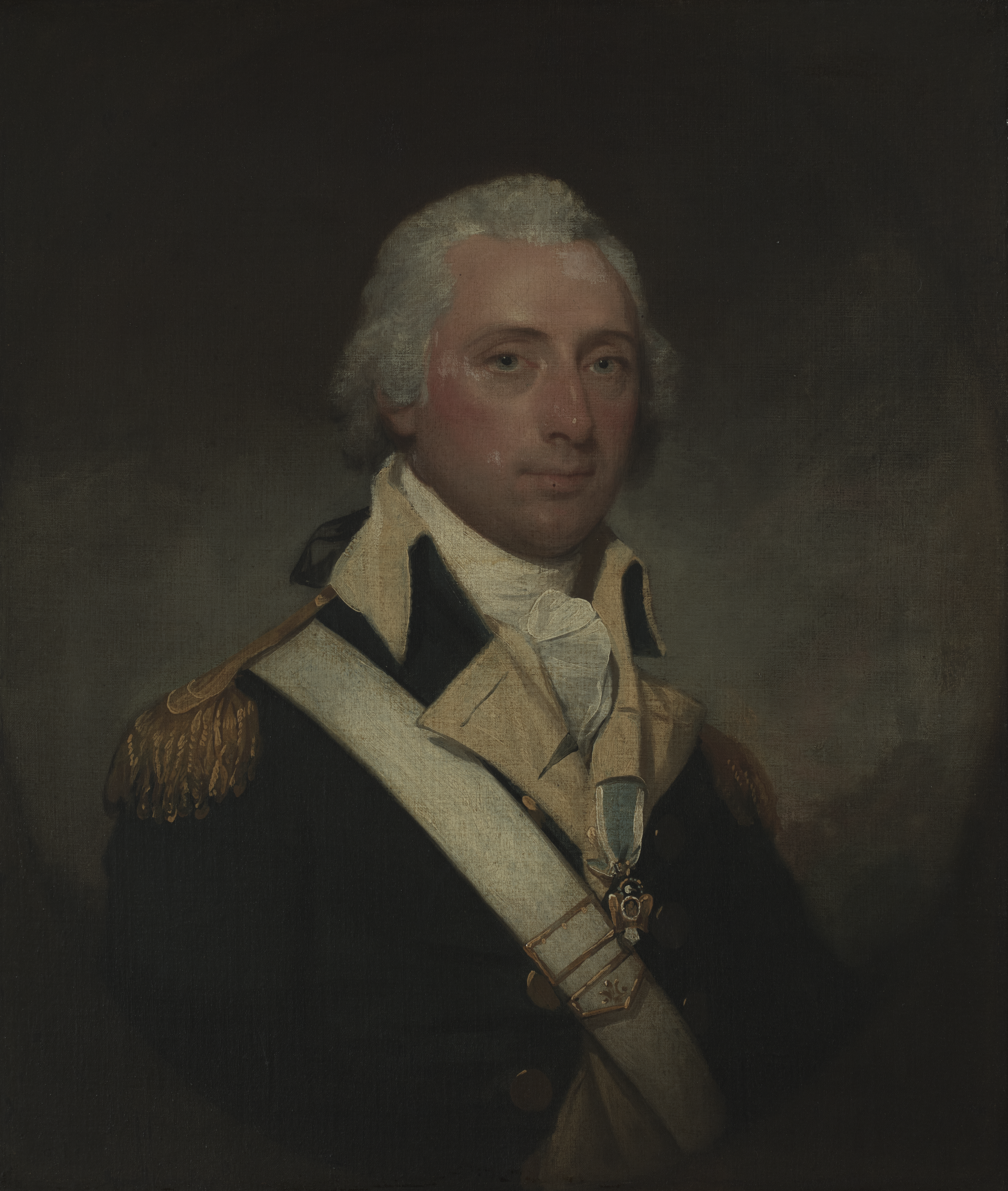
- Portrait by Gilbert Stuart, c. 1795

Member of the U.S. House of Representatives from New York's 17th district
- In office March 4, 1813 – March 3, 1815
- Preceded by: None; district established
- Succeeded by: Westel Willoughby Jr.

Personal details
- Born: November 8, 1755 Suffolk County, Province of New York, British America
- Died: June 10, 1816 (aged 60) Lebanon, New York, U.S.
- Party: Federalist
- Spouse: Abigail "Nabby" Adams (m. 1786; died 1813)
- Children: 4
- Education: College of New Jersey
- Profession: Military officer, government official

William Stephens Smith (November 8, 1755 – June 10, 1816) was a United States representative from New York. He married Abigail "Nabby" Adams, a daughter of President John Adams and First Lady Abigail Adams. He was also a brother-in-law of President John Quincy Adams.

== Early life ==
Born in Suffolk County, New York, on Long Island, he graduated from the College of New Jersey (now Princeton University) in 1774 and studied law for a short time.

== American Revolutionary War ==
Smith served in the Continental Army as aide-de-camp to General John Sullivan in 1776. He fought in the Battle of Long Island, was wounded at Harlem Heights, fought at the Battle of White Plains, was promoted to lieutenant colonel at the Battle of Trenton and fought at the Battle of Monmouth and Newport. He was on the staff of General Lafayette in 1780 and 1781, became an adjutant in the Corps of Light Infantry, then transferred to the staff of George Washington.

== Later life ==
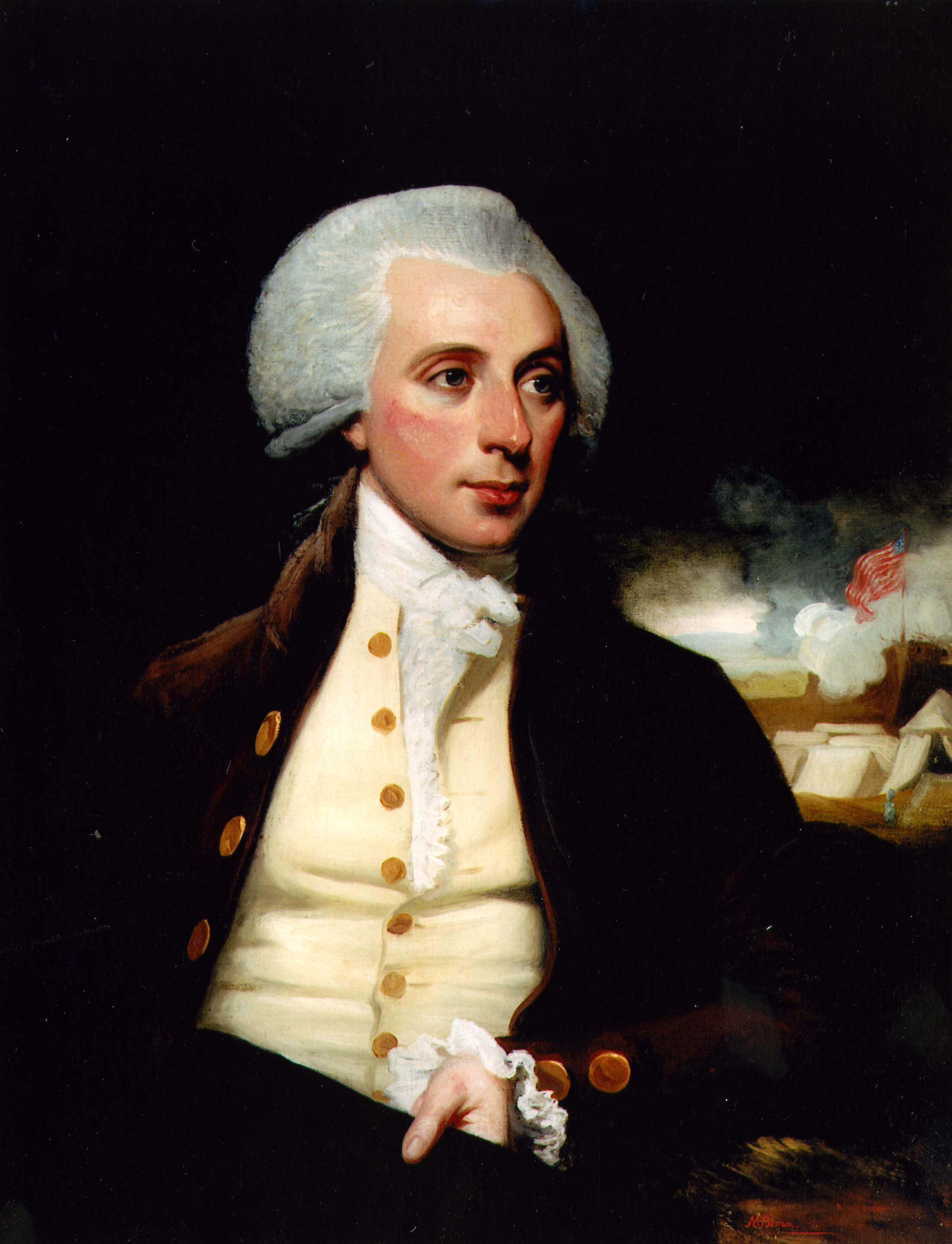
Portrait by Mather Brown, c. 1786

Smith was secretary of the Legation at London in 1784. While there, he met and courted John Adams's daughter, Abigail, whom he married in 1786. He returned to America in 1788.

He was appointed by President George Washington to be the first US Marshal for the District of New York in 1789 and later supervisor of revenue. He was one of the originators of the Society of the Cincinnati and served as its president from 1795 to 1797. He was appointed Surveyor of the Port of New York by President John Adams in 1800. The Smiths bought land in what was then the countryside outside New York City and planned to build an estate, which they called Mount Vernon, in honor of President Washington. They never lived there, but a carriage house on the property was later converted to a hotel and is now operated as the Mount Vernon Hotel Museum.

Along with General Francisco de Miranda, Colonel Smith raised private funds, procured weapons, and recruited soldiers of fortune to liberate Venezuela from Spanish colonial rule. That action was inspired by Smith's renewal of acquaintance with Miranda, whom Smith had first met when he was John Adams's secretary in London. On February 2, 1806, a force of 200 filibusters, including Smith's son William Steuben, set sail to Venezuela on a chartered merchant vessel, the Leander, armored by Samuel G. Ogden.

In Jacmel, Haiti, Miranda acquired two other ships, the Bacchus and the Bee. On April 28, a failed attempt to land in Ocumare de la Costa resulted in two Spanish vessels capturing the Bacchus and Bee. Sixty men, including Smith's son, were taken prisoner and put on trial in Puerto Cabello for piracy, and ten were sentenced to death by hanging. Their bodies were beheaded and quartered, with pieces sent to nearby towns as a warning. Smith survived and later escaped his captors and made his way home. Miranda, aboard the Leander and escorted by the packet ship HMS Lilly, escaped to the British islands of Grenada, Barbados, and Trinidad, where the governor Sir Thomas Hislop, 1st Baronet agreed to provide some support for a second attempt to invade Venezuela. The Leander left Port of Spain on July 24, together with HMS Express, HMS Attentive, HMS Prevost, and HMS Lilly, carrying some 220 officers and men.

General Miranda decided to land in La Vela de Coro and the squadron anchored there on August 1, carrying a flag that Miranda had designed, which later became the flag of modern Venezuela. Nevertheless, the local support that he had hoped for failed to materialize when the fighting started. Much of the local population joined the Spanish against the mercenaries and August 13, Miranda hastily retreated to Aruba and Trinidad, where he left the Leander to avoid the prosecution of Spanish fleet.

In the aftermath of the failed expedition, Colonel Smith and Ogden were indicted by a federal grand jury in New York for violating the Neutrality Act of 1794 and put on trial. Colonel Smith claimed his orders came from President Thomas Jefferson and US Secretary of State James Madison, who refused to appear in court. Judge William Paterson of the US Supreme Court ruled that the President "cannot authorize a person to do what the law forbids." Both Smith and Ogden stood trial and were found not guilty. His son, William Steuben, later escaped from the jail in Puerto Cabello.

In 1807, Smith moved to Lebanon, New York. He was elected as a Federalist to the 13th United States Congress, holding office from March 4, 1813, to March 3, 1815. He ran for a second term in 1814, and appeared to defeat Westel Willoughby Jr.

The Secretary of State of New York initially issued his credentials of election to the 14th United States Congress, but Smith did not claim the seat. Some of the ballots had been returned for "Westel Willoughby," without the "Jr.", and so Smith initially appeared to have a majority. Smith declined to challenge the results, and on December 15, 1815, at the start of the first session of the 14th Congress, the House voted that Willoughby was entitled to the seat.

== Death ==
Smith died in Smith Valley, Lebanon, New York in 1816. He is interred in West Hill Cemetery in Sherburne, New York.

== Family ==
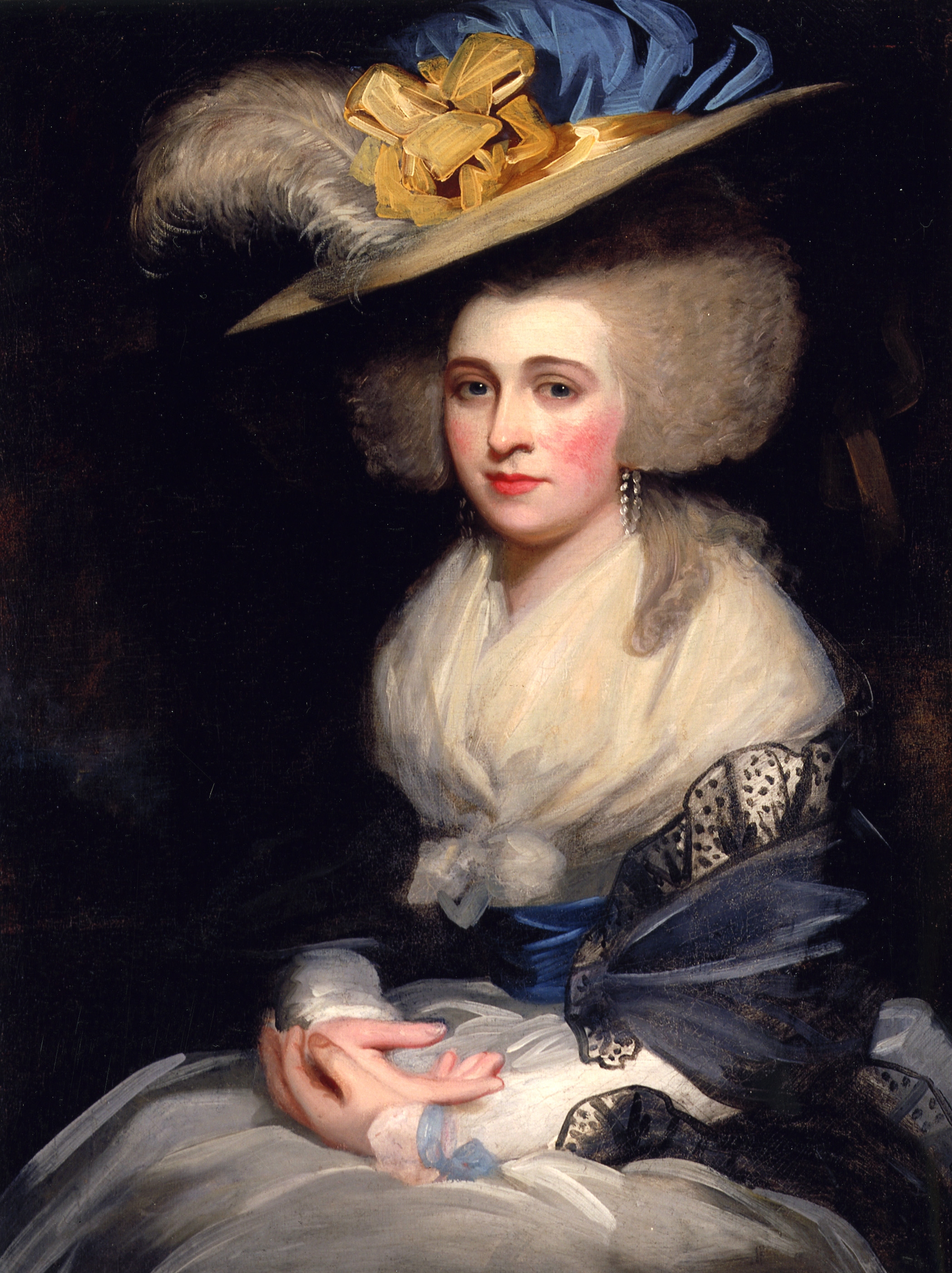
Abigail Adams Smith, portrait by Mather Brown

William Stephens Smith was the son of John Smith, a wealthy New York City merchant, and Margaret Stephens. His siblings included a sister, Sally, who was married to Charles Adams, the son of John Adams and brother of John Quincy Adams. Sally's daughter, Abigail Louisa Smith, Adams married the banker and philosopher Alexander Bryan Johnson; their son, William's grandnephew, Alexander Smith Johnson, became a judge.

He and his wife, Abigail Adams, had four children:

- William Steuben Smith (1787–1850)
- John Adams Smith (1788–1854)
- Thomas Hollis Smith (1790–1791)
- Caroline Amelia Smith (1795–1852) – married John Peter DeWint of Fishkill-on-Hudson

Adams family tree

John Adams (1735–1826)	Abigail Adams (née Smith) (1744–1818)
William Stephens Smith (1755–1816)	Abigail Amelia Adams Smith (1765–1813)	John Quincy Adams (1767–1848)	Louisa Catherine Adams (née Johnson) (1775–1852)	Charles Adams (1770–1800)	Thomas Boylston Adams (1772–1832)
George Washington Adams (1801–1829)	John Adams II (1803–1834)	Charles Francis Adams Sr. (1807–1886)	Abigail Brown Brooks (1808–1889)
Frances Cadwalader Crowninshield (1839–1911)	John Quincy Adams II (1833–1894)	Charles Francis Adams Jr. (1835–1915)	Henry Brooks Adams (1838–1918)	Marian Hooper Adams (1843–1885)	Peter Chardon Brooks Adams (1848–1927)
George Casper Adams (1863–1900)	Charles Francis Adams III (1866–1954)	Frances Adams (née Lovering) (1869–1956)	John Adams (1875–1964)
Henry Sturgis Morgan (1900–1982)	Catherine Lovering Adams Morgan (1902–1988)	Charles Francis Adams IV (1910–1999)	Thomas Boylston Adams (1910–1997)

== In popular culture ==
- Smith was portrayed by Andrew Scott in the 2008 miniseries, John Adams.
- Incidents in the Life of John Edsall is an autobiographical memoir published in Catskill, New York, in 1831. John Edsall (1788 – after 1850) was an illiterate American sailor who participated in several historically significant voyages and events. Edsall's seafaring adventures began at age 18 when he was inveigled into joining the filibustering expedition of General Francisco de Miranda to liberate Venezuela in 1806.

U.S. House of Representatives
Preceded by District restored	Member of the U.S. House of Representatives from New York's 17th congressional district 1813–1815	Succeeded by Westel Willoughby, Jr.
