= Thomas Boylston Adams (1910–1997) =

American business executive

Thomas Adams
- Born: July 25, 1910; Kansas City, Missouri, US
- Died: June 4, 1997 (aged 86); Lincoln, Massachusetts, US
- Education: Harvard College
- Spouse: Ramelle Frost Cochrane
- Children: 5
- Family: Adams

Thomas Boylston Adams (July 25, 1910 – June 4, 1997) was an American business executive, writer, academician, and political candidate.

== Early life ==
Adams was born on July 25, 1910, in Kansas City, Missouri. His parents were John Francis Adams and Marian Morse Adams, and his grandfather was Charles Francis Adams Jr., through whom he was a member of the Adams political family of Massachusetts and a descendant of American presidents John Adams and John Quincy Adams. He was named for John Quincy Adams's brother Thomas Boylston Adams (1772–1832), whose son also shared the same name.

Adams was graduated from the Groton School and then attended Harvard College. He was a captain in the United States Army Air Corps during World War II, a vice president of the Sheraton Corporation of America from 1954 to 1963, and president of Adams Securities from 1964 to 1968.

== Career ==
Adams was president of the Massachusetts Historical Society (1957–1975) and treasurer of the American Academy of Arts and Sciences (1955–1990). He was a trustee of the Adams papers (a collection of 300,000 pages of diaries, letters and other writings papers from four generations of his family) and helped organize them for public use. He was a columnist for The Boston Globe from 1974 to 1991.

In 1966, Adams, an early and vocal opponent of the Vietnam War, ran a quixotic campaign as a peace candidate for the Democratic nomination for the United States Senate, against two far better-known candidates: former governor Endicott Peabody and Boston mayor John F. Collins. Adams got about 8% of the vote as Peabody won the nomination (and was easily defeated in turn by Republican Edward Brooke). He ran for Congress in 1968 and was a delegate to the 1972 Democratic National Convention.

== Personal life ==
Adams was married for 57 years to the former Ramelle Frost Cochrane; the couple had five children.

Adams died on June 4, 1997, in Lincoln, Massachusetts.

== Published works ==
- Adams, Thomas Boylston (1981). A New Nation. Globe Pequot Press. ISBN 978-0871069597.

== Family tree ==
Adams family tree

John Adams (1735–1826)	Abigail Adams (née Smith) (1744–1818)
William Stephens Smith (1755–1816)	Abigail Amelia Adams Smith (1765–1813)	John Quincy Adams (1767–1848)	Louisa Catherine Adams (née Johnson) (1775–1852)	Charles Adams (1770–1800)	Thomas Boylston Adams (1772–1832)
George Washington Adams (1801–1829)	John Adams II (1803–1834)	Charles Francis Adams Sr. (1807–1886)	Abigail Brown Brooks (1808–1889)
Frances Cadwalader Crowninshield (1839–1911)	John Quincy Adams II (1833–1894)	Charles Francis Adams Jr. (1835–1915)	Henry Brooks Adams (1838–1918)	Marian Hooper Adams (1843–1885)	Peter Chardon Brooks Adams (1848–1927)
George Casper Adams (1863–1900)	Charles Francis Adams III (1866–1954)	Frances Adams (née Lovering) (1869–1956)	John Adams (1875–1964)
Henry Sturgis Morgan (1900–1982)	Catherine Lovering Adams Morgan (1902–1988)	Charles Francis Adams IV (1910–1999)	Thomas Boylston Adams (1910–1997)
