= Charles Adams (1770–1800) =

Son of John Adams (1770–1800)

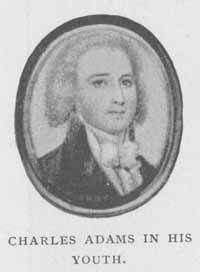
- Born: May 29, 1770; Boston, Province of Massachusetts Bay, British America
- Died: November 30, 1800 (aged 30); New York City, U.S.
- Spouse: Sarah "Sally" Smith (m. 1795)
- Children: Susanna; Abigail
- Parents: John Adams; Abigail Smith
- Family: Adams political family Quincy political family

Charles Adams (May 29, 1770 – November 30, 1800) was the second son of the second president of the United States, John Adams, and his wife, Abigail Adams (née Smith). He was also the younger brother of the sixth president of the United States, John Quincy Adams.

== Early life ==
Coat of Arms of John Adams, the second U.S. president

When Charles was a child, a smallpox epidemic broke out, killing many. Charles and his family were inoculated for the disease. He and his younger brother Thomas were not showing the expected response, so they both had the procedure done a few more times. His mother, Abigail Adams, his younger brother Thomas and older brother John Quincy had mild symptoms, but he and his older sister Nabby were both very sick, though both recovered within weeks.

At the age of nine, he traveled with his father and older brother, John Quincy, to Europe, studying in Passy, Amsterdam, and Leiden. He matriculated in Leiden on January 29, 1781. In December 1781, 11-year-old Charles returned to America unaccompanied by family members. He had been feeling homesick. In 1784, Abigail and Nabby moved to England to live with John Adams, who was working there at the time. John Quincy would join them later.

== College ==
In June of 1789, while attending Harvard College, where he began at age 15 in 1785, Charles and his friends got into a scrape for drinking heavily and running naked through Harvard Yard. One of his friends was expelled. This night was the first recorded case of Primal Scream. John Quincy and Thomas would later attend Harvard after Charles.

== Legal career ==
After graduating from Harvard College in 1789, he moved to New York City, where plans had been made for him to work in the legal office of Alexander Hamilton. However, President Washington named Hamilton to be his Secretary of the Treasury, thereby closing his private law office, and young Adams transferred to the law office of John Laurance and continued his studies. Adams passed the bar examination in 1792.

== Personal life ==
On August 29, 1795, Adams married Sarah "Sally" Smith (1769–1828), the sister of his brother-in-law, William Stephens Smith. They had two daughters, Susanna Boylston (1796–1884) and Abigail Louisa Smith (1798–1836). However, Adams was an alcoholic who engaged in extramarital relationships and made questionable financial decisions. He was disowned by his father and sometimes lived apart from his family.

Daughter Abigail would marry the banker and philosopher Alexander Bryan Johnson (1786–1867); at the age of 37, Abigail Louisa died of uterine cancer. Her son (Adams' grandson) Alexander Smith Johnson (1817–1878), would be named to the New York and federal bench.

=== Death ===
It is a common myth that Adams, who died on November 30, 1800, died of cirrhosis, a disease often caused by alcoholism. In a letter from Abigail to John Quincy after his death, she stated Adams died in New York City of "dropsy of the chest" or pleurisy. Pleurisy can be caused by a multitude of respiratory diseases, such as tuberculosis, pneumonia, and cancer. He was the first child of a president to die while the president was in office. He was 30 years old.

== In popular culture ==
In 2008, HBO presented the miniseries entitled John Adams based on the 2001 book by David McCullough. The biographical presentation depicts John Adams as a neglectful father to Charles and suggests that the elder Adams' failures as a father adversely influenced Charles' development. Historians have pointed out the inaccuracies of the series' representation of their relationship.
