= John Quincy Adams Birthplace =

Historic house in Massachusetts, United States

- U.S. National Register of Historic Places
- U.S. National Historic Landmark
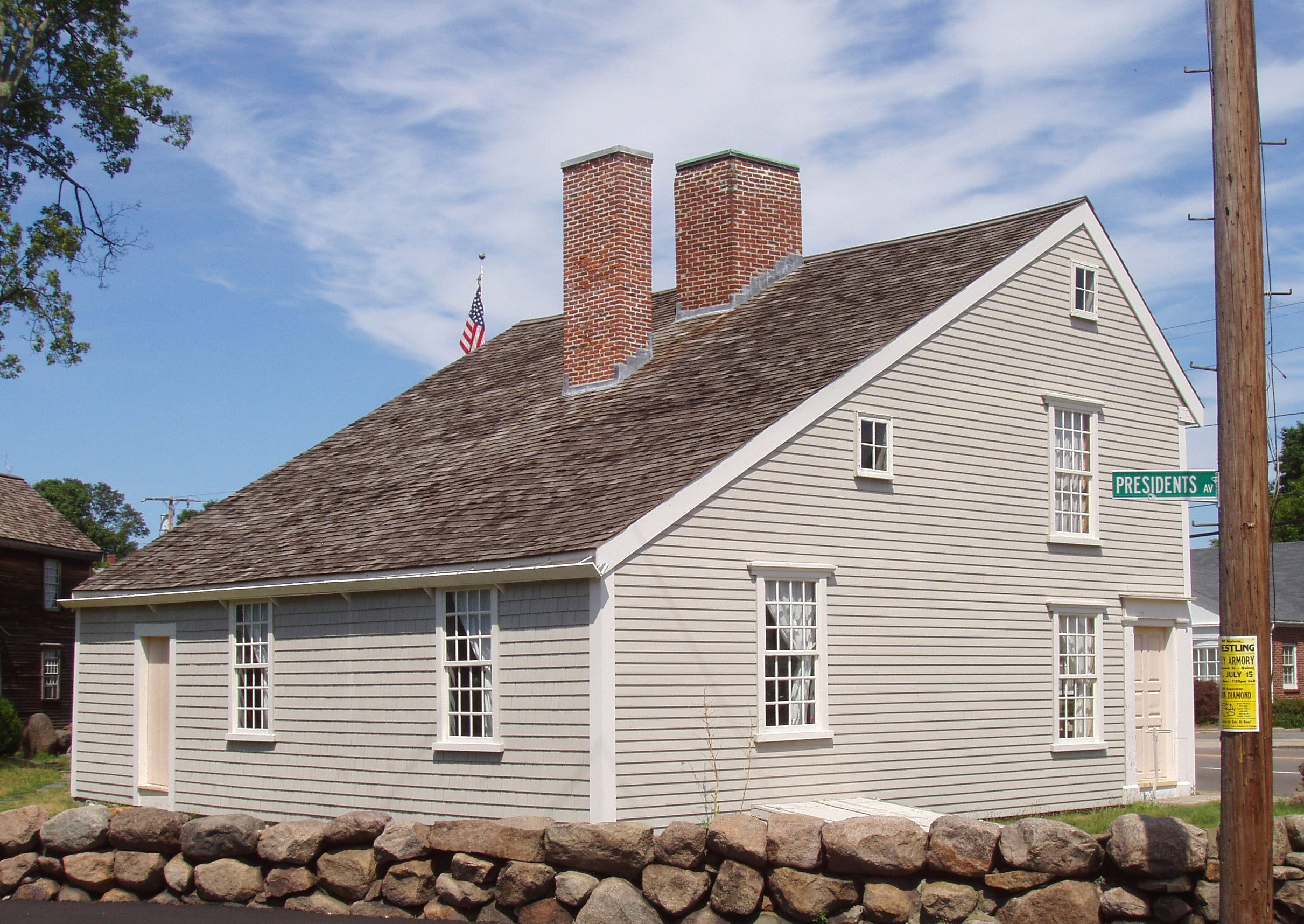
- Rear view of the birthplace of President John Quincy Adams, Quincy, Massachusetts.

- Location within Massachusetts Location within the United States
- Location: 141 Franklin Street, Quincy, Massachusetts
- Coordinates: 42°14′20.88″N 71°0′15.21″W
- Built: 1716
- NRHP reference No.: 66000128

Significant dates
- Added to NRHP: October 15, 1966
- Designated NHL: December 19, 1960

The John Quincy Adams Birthplace is a historic house at 141 Franklin Street in Quincy, Massachusetts. It is the saltbox home in which the sixth United States President, John Quincy Adams, was born in 1767. The family lived in this home during the time John Adams helped found the United States with his work on the Declaration of Independence and the American Revolutionary War. His own birthplace is only 75 feet (23 m) away, on the same property.

Both houses are National Historic Landmarks, and part of Adams National Historical Park, operated by the National Park Service.

== Construction history ==
The house is a 2 1/2 story wood frame saltbox style house, sheathed in wooden clapboards. There are two main rooms, one on either side of a central chimney, on each of the two floors, and there are two further rooms in the lean-to section on the first floor. The main facade is three bays wide with the entry in the center. The doorway is framed by pilasters and topped by an entablature and triangular pediment. A similarly treated entrance is located at the southeast corner of the building.

The house was built in 1717, with the rear lean-to added later. This house was purchased in 1744 by Deacon John Adams, and was probably enlarged by him, adding the rooms on the other side of the chimney. He gave the house to his son, the future second president, in 1761. The younger John Adams moved into the house in 1764; it was around this time that the lean-to was added, as well as the door trim and the secondary entrance.

== Later history ==
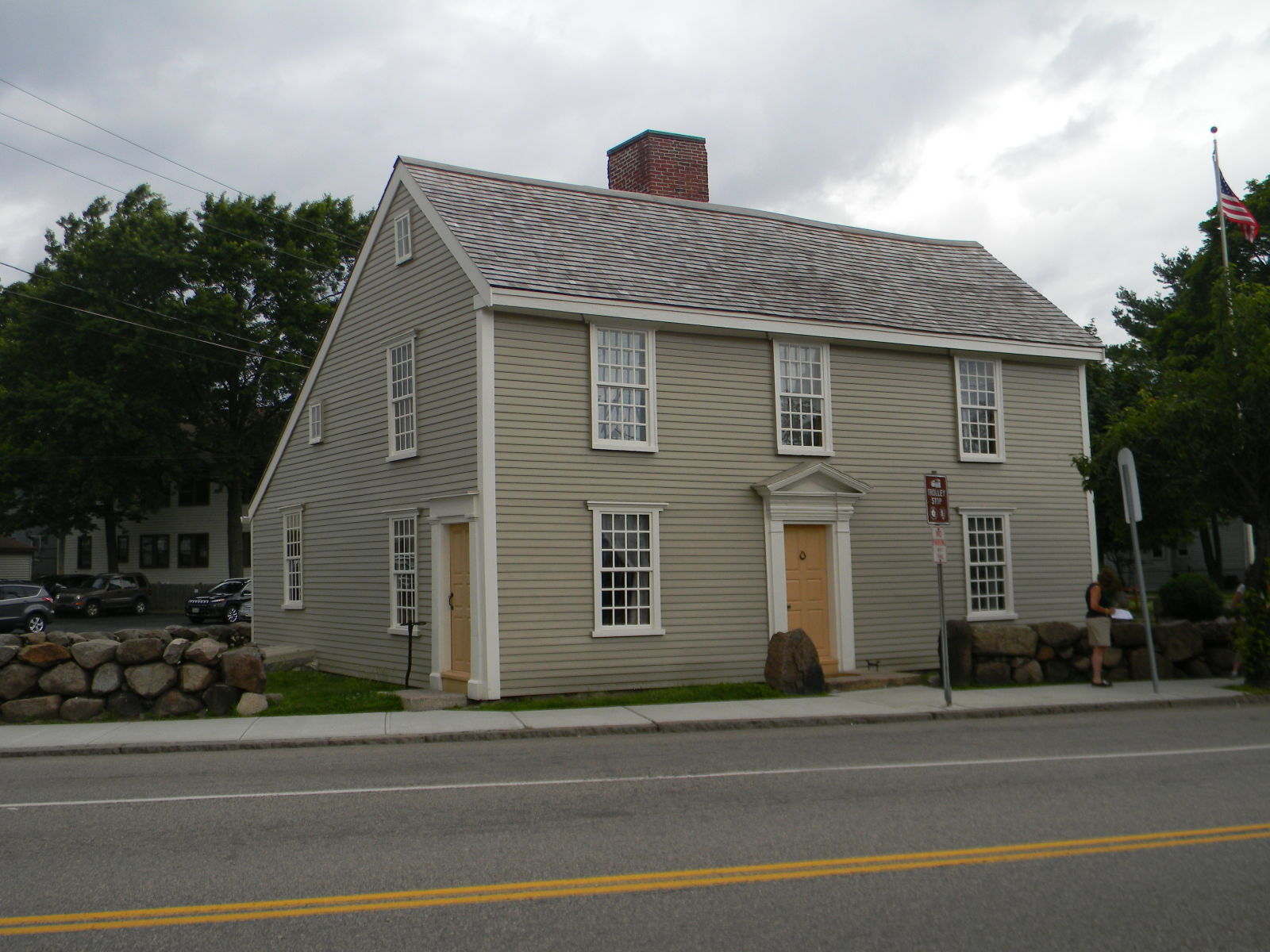
Front Elevation, 2015

John and Abigail Adams made the house their home until 1783, after which it was rented to tenants. John Quincy Adams purchased both this house and the neighboring birthplace of his father in 1803, and lived in this house from 1805 to 1807. The houses were rented to tenants until 1885, at which time much of the surrounding land was sold off. In 1895 Charles Francis Adams, Jr. authorized the Quincy Historical Society to use the house as its headquarters. The house was sold to the City of Quincy in 1940, which continued to rent it to the Historical Society.

On December 19, 1960, the birthplace was designated a National Historic Landmark. The border of the national historic landmark includes both houses and a park area. The two houses are now part of the Adams National Historical Park, and are operated by the National Park Service.

The elder Adams' later mansion, called Peacefield, is a few miles away, as are the graves of both presidents and their wives in the United First Parish Church. The Abigail Adams Cairn, atop a nearby hill from which Abigail and the 7-year old John Quincy Adams watched the Battle of Bunker Hill and the burning of Charlestown, is also of interest. All are open to the public.

== In popular culture ==
The home was prominently portrayed during the first few episodes of John Adams, a 2008 American miniseries.

== See also ==
- List of National Historic Landmarks in Massachusetts
- National Register of Historic Places listings in Quincy, Massachusetts
- Presidential memorials in the United States
