= Adams political family =

Politically influential family in U.S. history

Adams family
- Current region: Massachusetts, U.S.
- Origin: Barton St David, Somerset, Kingdom of England
- Connected families: Quincy family (U.S.)
- Motto: Fidem libertatem amicitiam retinebis ("Hold fast to liberty, friendship, and faith")
- Estate: Peacefield (Quincy, Massachusetts)

The Adams family is an American political family of English origins, most prominent between the late 18th century and the early 20th century. Based in eastern Massachusetts, they formed part of the Boston Brahmin community. The family traces to Henry Adams of Barton St David, Somerset, in England, and his father, John Adams Its members include U.S. presidents John Adams and John Quincy Adams, and Founding Father Samuel Adams.

The two presidents and their descendants are also descended from John Alden, who came to the United States on the Mayflower.

The Adams family is one of four families to have produced two presidents of the United States by the same surname, the others being the Bush, Roosevelt, and Harrison families.

== John Adams ==
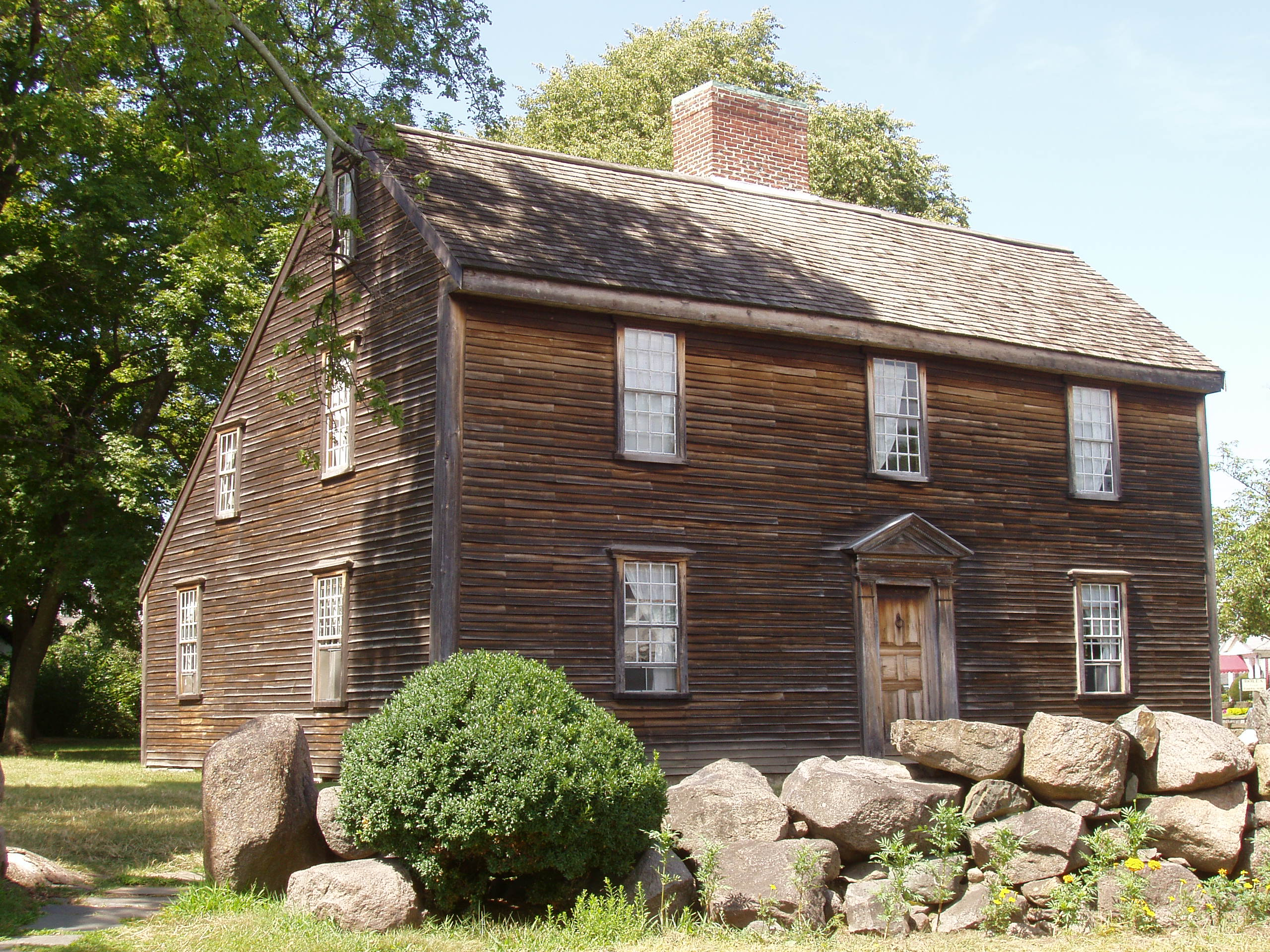
Adams' birthplace in Quincy, Massachusetts

John Adams was born on October 30, 1735 (October 19, 1735, O.S, Julian calendar), to John Adams Sr. and Susanna Boylston. He had two younger brothers: Peter (1738–1823) and Elihu (1741–1775). Adams was born on the family farm in Braintree, Massachusetts. (Note: The site of the Adams house is now in Quincy, Massachusetts, which was separated from Braintree and organized as a new town in 1792.) His mother was from a leading medical family of present-day Brookline, Massachusetts. His father was a deacon in the Congregational Church, a farmer, a cordwainer, and a lieutenant in the militia. John Sr. served as a selectman (town councilman) and supervised the building of schools and roads. Adams often praised his father and recalled their close relationship. Adams's great-great-grandfather Henry Adams immigrated to Massachusetts from Braintree, Essex, England, around 1638.

Though raised in modest surroundings, Adams felt pressured to live up to his heritage. His family was descended from Puritans, whose strict religious doctrines had profoundly shaped New England's culture, laws, and traditions. By the time of John Adams's birth, Puritan tenets such as predestination had waned and many of their severe practices moderated, but Adams still "considered them bearers of freedom, a cause that still had a holy urgency". Adams recalled that his parents "'held every Species of Libertinage in ... Contempt and horror,' ... and painted 'pictures of disgrace, or baseness and of Ruin' that would result from licentious behavior". Adams later noted that "As a child I enjoyed perhaps the greatest of blessings that can be bestowed upon men – that of a mother who was anxious and capable to form the characters of her children."

Adams, as the eldest child, was compelled to obtain a formal education. This began at age six at a dame school for boys and girls, conducted at a teacher's home, and was centered upon The New England Primer. Shortly thereafter, Adams attended Braintree Latin School under Joseph Cleverly, where studies included Latin, rhetoric, logic, and arithmetic. Adams's early education included incidents of truancy, a dislike for his master, and a desire to become a farmer. All discussion on the matter ended with his father's command that he remain in school: "You shall comply with my desires." Deacon Adams hired a new schoolmaster named Joseph Marsh, and his son responded positively.

== Members ==
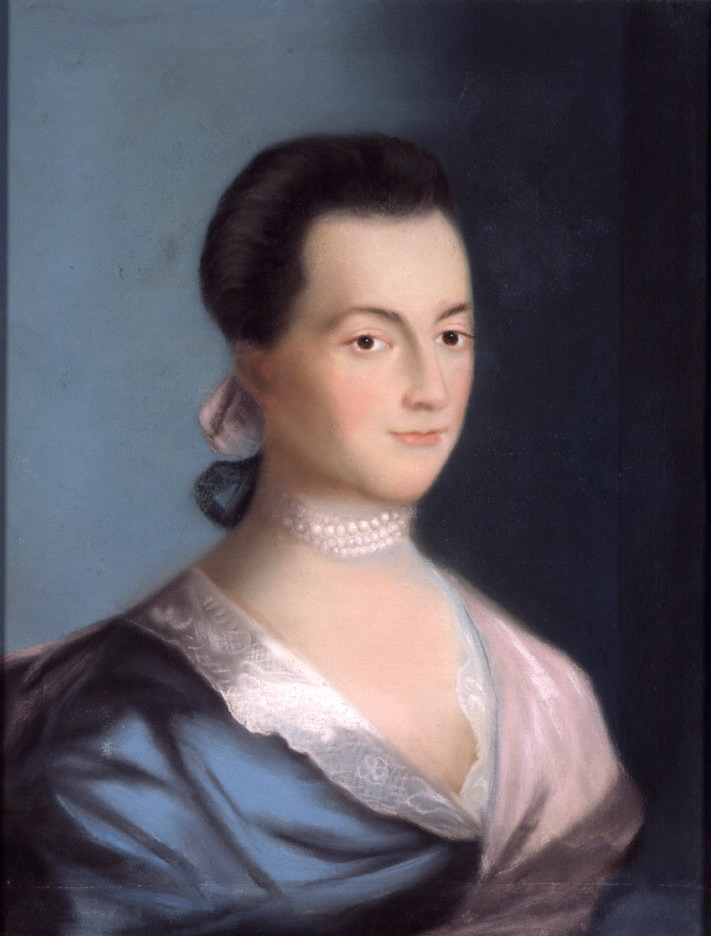
Abigail Smith Adams – 1766 portrait by Benjamin Blyth

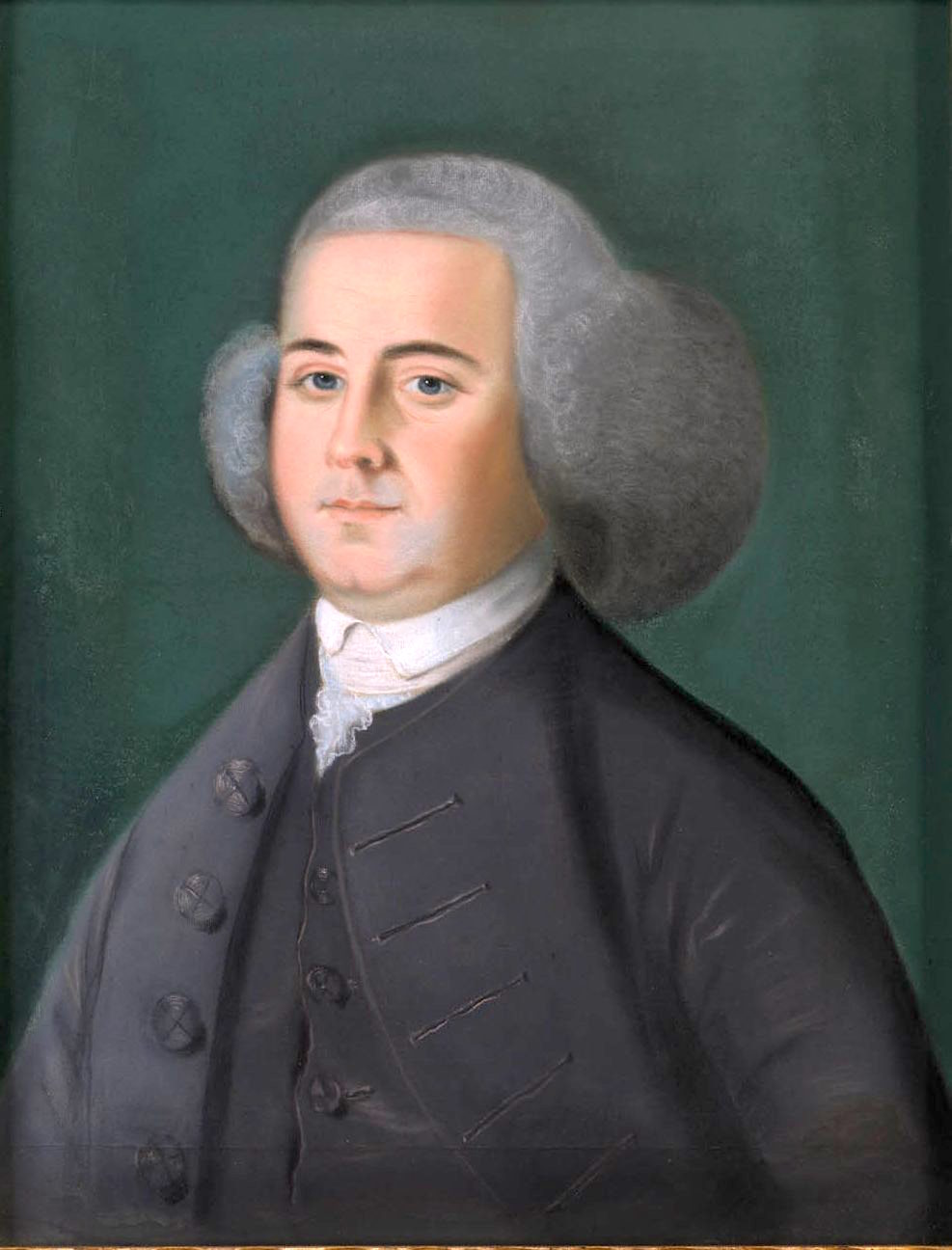
John Adams – 1766 portrait also by Blyth

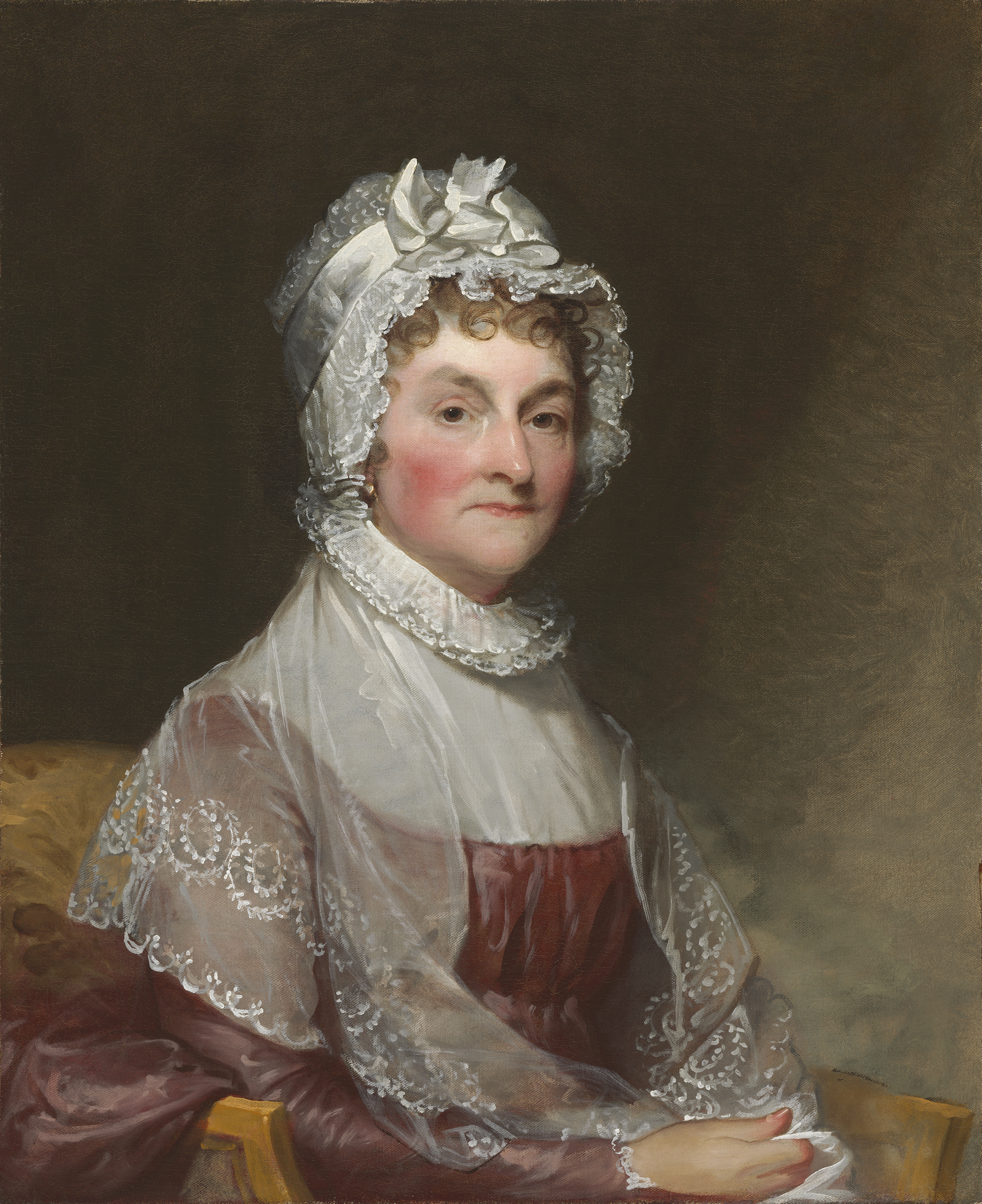
Abigail Smith Adams – 1800–1815 portrait by Gilbert Stuart

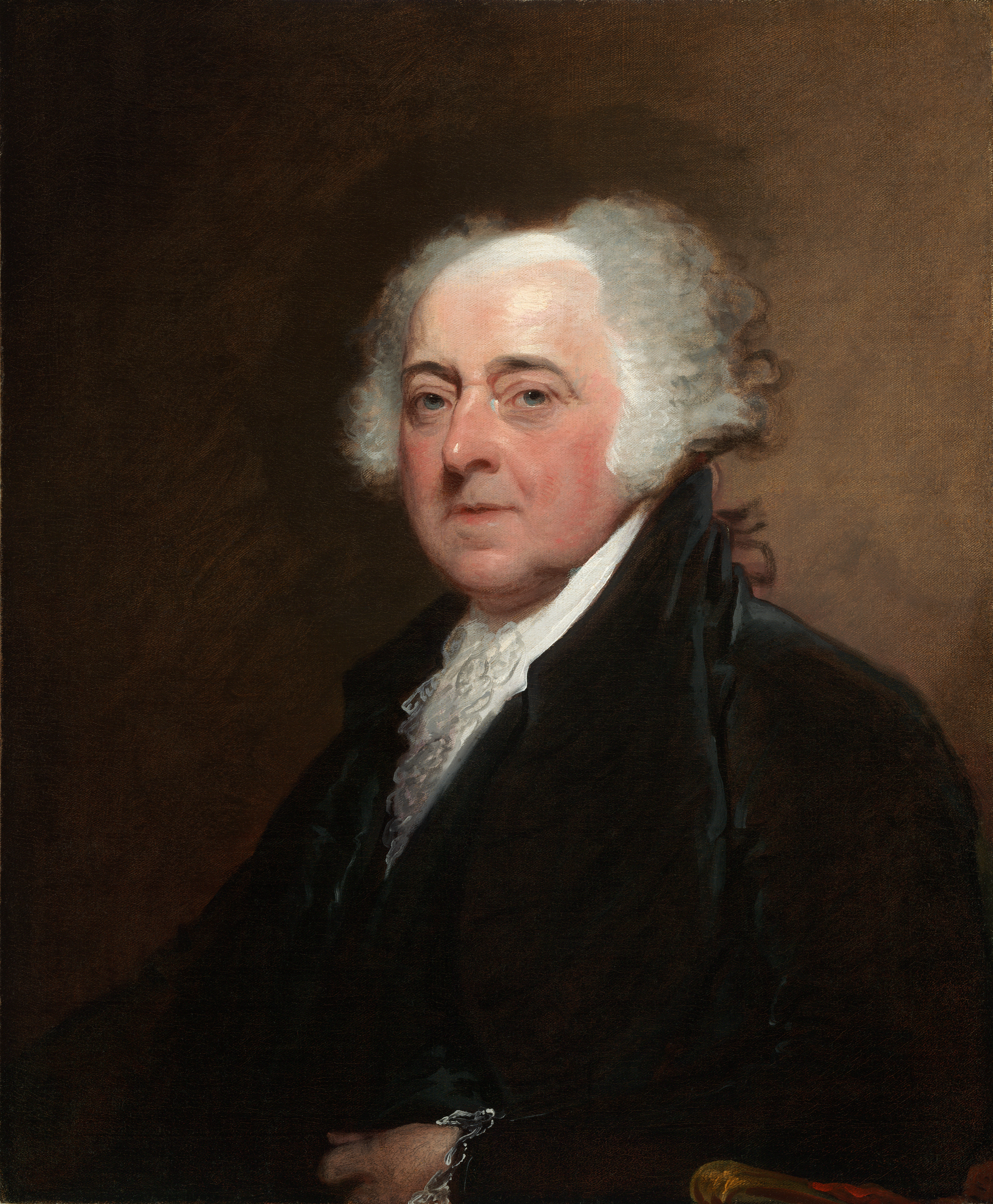
John Adams – 1800–1815 portrait by Gilbert Stuart

Coat of Arms of John Adams, the second U.S. president

Coat of Arms of John Quincy Adams, the sixth U.S. president

- Henry Adams (1583–1646) born Barton St David, Somerset, England, first of the clan who immigrated to New England, United States.
- John Adams Sr. (1691–1761), married Susanna Boylston (1708–1797)
  - John Adams (1735–1826), second president of the United States, married Abigail Adams (née Smith) (1744–1818).
    - John Quincy Adams (1767–1848), sixth president of the United States, married English-born Louisa Adams (née Johnson) (1775–1852).
      - George Washington Adams (1801–1829), member of Massachusetts state legislature.
      - John Adams II (1803–1834), private secretary to his father.
      - Charles Francis Adams Sr. (1807–1886), U.S. Congressman and Ambassador to the United Kingdom.
        - John Quincy Adams II (1833–1894), lawyer and politician.
          - George Caspar Adams (1863–1900), prominent college athlete and football coach at Harvard University.
          - Charles Francis Adams III (1866–1954), 44th Secretary of the Navy, mayor of Quincy, Massachusetts.
            - Charles Francis Adams IV (1910–1999), first president of Raytheon.
          - Abigail Adams (1879–1974), m. Robert Homans
            - George C. Homans (1910–1989), President of the American Sociological Association
        - Charles Francis Adams Jr. (1835–1915), brigadier-general in the Union Army during the American Civil War and president of the Union Pacific Railroad from 1884 to 1890. His granddaughter was artist Mary Ogden Abbott.
          - John Adams (1875–1964), married Marian Morse.
            - Thomas Boylston Adams (1910–1997), executive, writer, and political candidate.
        - Henry Brooks Adams (1838–1918), prominent author and political commentator, married Marian Hooper Adams (née Hooper) (1843–1885).
        - Brooks Adams (1848–1927), historian and political scientist.
    - Charles Adams (1770–1800), New York lawyer. His grandson Alexander S. Johnson was a federal judge.
    - Thomas Boylston Adams (1772–1832), Massachusetts legislator and judge.
  - Elihu Adams (1741–1775), younger brother of John Adams and captain in the Massachusetts Militia during the American Revolutionary War.
- Samuel Adams (1722–1803), revolutionary, delegate to the Continental Congress and governor of Massachusetts, second U.S. president John Adams's second cousin.
- John Adams (1745–1849), shoemaker, revolutionary war veteran, second U.S. president John Adams's third cousin once removed.
- Samuel A. Adams (1934–1988), historian and CIA analyst.
- John Donley Adams (born 1973), American politician and lawyer.

== Family religion ==
Adams was raised a Congregationalist but left the denomination as a young man. By his early 20s, he identified as a Unitarian, a Protestant denomination that had been recently formed. Adams always felt pressured to live up to his family's Puritan heritage. By the time of his birth, the Congregationalists no longer called themselves "Puritans"; their severe practices had largely been dropped in the First Great Awakening of the 1730s. Adams praised them historically as bearers of freedom, a cause that still had a holy urgency". Adams recalled that his parents "held every Species of Libertinage in ... Contempt and horror", and detailed "pictures of disgrace, or baseness and of Ruin" resulting from any debauchery.

According to Dr. Sara Georgini, editor of The John Adams Papers:

From John Adams through his grandson Charles Francis, the Adams family creed was conventionally Unitarian. They believed in a guiding Providence. They trusted that human will empowered them to freely accept or reject God’s grace. They turned away from miracles and revelation, preferring biblical criticism and lay inquiry to broaden the mind beyond the passive reception of dogma. Acknowledging Jesus as a “master workman” and gifted moral teacher, they grew fuzzy about his divinity, opting instead to scrutinize his teachings and doctrines as they related to contemporary culture. In line with their Protestant peers, most Adamses mistrusted the sensory emphasis and hierarchical nature of “Romish” Catholicism, but they revered Judaism as a source of lawmaking and ethics.

== Family tree ==
The following is a selective family tree of notable members of the Adams family relative to Charles Francis Adams IV:

President John Quincy Adams	Louisa Catherine Johnson	Peter Chardon Brooks	Abigail [Brown]
Charles Francis Adams Sr.	Abigail Brown Brooks	George Caspar Crowninshield	Harriet [Sears]
Charles Francis Adams Jr.	John Quincy Adams II	Frances Cadwalader [Crowninshield]
John Quincy Adams III	George Caspar Adams	Charles Francis Adams III	Frances [Lovering]	Frances C. Adams	Arthur Adams	Margery Lee [Sargeant]	Abigail ("Hitty") Adams	Robert Homans
Catherine Lovering Adams	Henry Sturgis Morgan	Charles Francis Adams IV	Margaret [Stockton]	3 Sons, 1 Daughter
Five Sons	Abigail Adams	James C. Manny	Allison Adams	Paul G. Hagan	Timothy Adams

Adams family tree

John Adams (1735–1826)	Abigail Adams (née Smith) (1744–1818)
William Stephens Smith (1755–1816)	Abigail Amelia Adams Smith (1765–1813)	John Quincy Adams (1767–1848)	Louisa Catherine Adams (née Johnson) (1775–1852)	Charles Adams (1770–1800)	Thomas Boylston Adams (1772–1832)
George Washington Adams (1801–1829)	John Adams II (1803–1834)	Charles Francis Adams Sr. (1807–1886)	Abigail Brown Brooks (1808–1889)
Frances Cadwalader Crowninshield (1839–1911)	John Quincy Adams II (1833–1894)	Charles Francis Adams Jr. (1835–1915)	Henry Brooks Adams (1838–1918)	Marian Hooper Adams (1843–1885)	Peter Chardon Brooks Adams (1848–1927)
George Casper Adams (1863–1900)	Charles Francis Adams III (1866–1954)	Frances Adams (née Lovering) (1869–1956)	John Adams (1875–1964)
Henry Sturgis Morgan (1900–1982)	Catherine Lovering Adams Morgan (1902–1988)	Charles Francis Adams IV (1910–1999)	Thomas Boylston Adams (1910–1997)

== Harvard University and the Adams family ==
The Adams family had an extensive relationship with Harvard University in Cambridge, Massachusetts. The following members of the family attended and graduated from Harvard:

- John Adams, class of 1755
- John Quincy Adams, class of 1788 and faculty member
- Charles Adams, class of 1789
- Thomas Boylston Adams, class of 1790
- George Washington Adams, class of 1821
- John Adams II, expelled with most of senior class prior to 1823 graduation, later among those designated "Bachelor of Arts as of 1823" and added to Harvard's Roll of Graduates
- John Quincy Adams II, class of 1853
- Charles Francis Adams Sr., class of 1825
- Charles Francis Adams Jr., class of 1856
- Henry Brooks Adams, class of 1858 and faculty member
- Brooks Adams, class of 1870
- George Caspar Adams, class of 1886, played football at Harvard and served as their head football coach for three seasons
- Charles Francis Adams III, class of 1888
- Roger Adams, class of 1909
- Charles Francis Adams IV, class of 1932
- Thomas Boylston Adams, class of 1933 (did not graduate)
- Samuel A. Adams – class of 1955

Adams House, one of 12 residential colleges at Harvard, is named after John Adams and later members of the Adams family.

== Memorials ==
- Adams Memorial
- Adams National Historical Park
  - Peacefield

== See also ==
- List of United States political families
- The Adams Chronicles - 1976 television miniseries
