= John Adams Sr. =

British colonial farmer, minister, father of U.S. President John Adams (1691-1762)

The Reverend John Adams Sr.
- Born: John Adams; February 8, 1691; Braintree, Massachusetts Bay
- Died: May 25, 1761 (aged 70); Braintree, Massachusetts Bay (now Quincy)
- Occupations: Farmer and minister
- Spouse: Susanna Boylston
- Children: 3, including John Adams Jr.
- Relatives: Adams political family

John Adams Sr. (February 8, 1691 – May 25, 1761), also known as Deacon John, was an American colonial farmer and minister. Adams was the father of the second U.S. president, John Adams, and paternal grandfather of the sixth president, John Quincy Adams. Adams worked as a farmer and cobbler (also called a cord-wainer or shoemaker) for most of his life. Adams' descendants include many prominent persons in American history, and his home is a National Park, the Adams National Historical Park.

== Family ==
He was the son of Joseph Adams Jr., the grandson of Joseph Adams, and the great-grandson of Henry Adams, who emigrated from Braintree, Essex, in England to Massachusetts Bay Colony in about 1638. His other ancestors include John and Priscilla Alden. He also was a first cousin, once removed, of Samuel Adams.

== Career ==
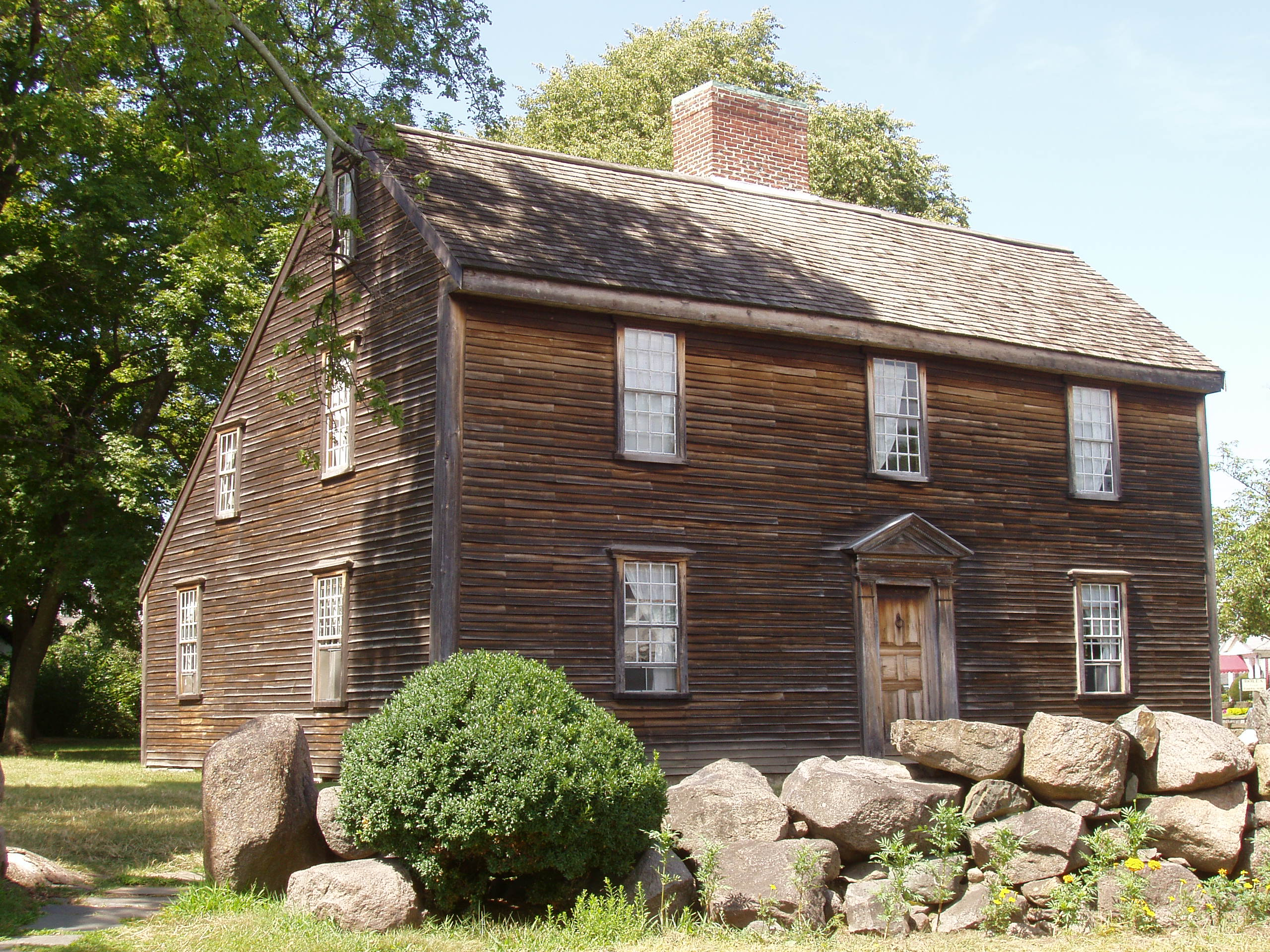
John Adams Birthplace, owned by John Adams Sr. from 1720 until his death

In 1720, Adams purchased a farm in what is now Quincy, Massachusetts (then called the "north precinct" of Braintree, Massachusetts). The location of his farm, and where his children were born, is now part of Adams National Historical Park. This saltbox house, a simple and common dwelling characterized by its sloping roof, is operated by the National Park Service as the John Adams Birthplace (named after his son), and is open to the public. On December 19, 1960, the birthplace was designated a National Historic Landmark. The future President lived here with his parents on the farm until 1764, when he married Abigail Smith. His house lay at an angle to the road. Adams also owned the adjacent home, now the John Quincy Adams Birthplace, which he leased to his niece, Ann Adams Savil, and her husband Dr. Elisha Savil through the late 1740s, into which the future President would move with his wife and live through the Revolution.

Adams was primarily a farmer during the growing season, and also worked as a shoemaker, for which he earned "hard money" as a trade during the winters. He was a freeholder, who owned rather than rented his land. He was proud of being a landowner and felt that land was a good investment, only once selling land: ten acres to pay for his son John Adams' Harvard education.

Adams was also a deacon in his church, a lieutenant in the Massachusetts colonial militia, a tax collector, and a selectman of the Town of Braintree (for 20 years). He was a Congregationalist (that is, Puritan) deacon. The younger John Adams wrote of the religion his father was so passionate for, "[they are] bearers of freedom, a cause that still had holy urgency." The future president was first known by reputation as the "dutiful son of Deacon John".

As a selectman or town councilman, for 20 years, he supervised the poor house, schools, and roads. His wife forced him to resign as selectman after a "family row" over his taking in a destitute young female. A leading local man, other men would stop by "Deacon John's house" to discuss business or religion. He even received a visit from Punkapaug and Neponset Indian chiefs.

Adams older brother Joseph Adams III attended Harvard College, and Deacon John wanted his eldest son to attend there as well. He did not want his son to be a farmer, but rather, a minister.

Although he was a simple man who "never set foot outside of New England," his son John Adams was proud of his father, praising him in private correspondence to Benjamin Rush as well as in his public obituary, which he wrote on the back of his father's will. The president praised his father and paternal ancestors as "independent country gentlemen," who had not gone bankrupt, did not gamble, and had never committed fraud.

== Marriage and family ==
Adams married well, to Susanna Boylston, from a prominent family of scientists and medical doctors, in October 1734. His bride came from the wealthy and respected line of Boylstons of Brookline. Susanna had a "higher social standing" than him. When their first son went to Harvard, his class rank was determined primarily by his mother's socio-economic status. Since it is known that he and his sons read out letters to her, Susanna might have been illiterate, as were many women of her class and day.

The Adams family "lived plainly." Together they raised a family of three sons, of which John Adams was the oldest; their other sons were Peter and Elihu. Peter Boylston Adams was a farmer and militia captain of Braintree, Massachusetts. Elihu Adams was a company commander in the militia during the American Revolution, who died from dysentery early in the war in 1775.

Adams bequeathed his son the "humble notions of equality and fairness." He was a strict father who appears to have believed in patriarchy. He raised his sons to join the militia, and would rap out reveille on his kitchen table. Like many families of the day, he homeschooled his sons. He later sent his son John to a private school run by Joseph Marsh.

The senior John pressed upon his son to live up to his high Puritan origins, which young John continued to strive towards for the rest of his life. When his eldest son went to Harvard College, aged sixteen, his father expected him to become a minister, as the elder had done. Adams was concerned that his son would become a mere farmer as he also had been, and had known how difficult a life it had been. However, younger John became a schoolteacher in Worcester in 1756 and, later, decided to study law in the office of James Putnam.

Adams died of influenza on May 25, 1761, at age 70, and was buried in Braintree. His widow Susanna later married John Hall. His son purchased his house and 53 acres (21 ha) after his death.

== Sources ==
- David McCullough, John Adams (New York: Simon & Schuster 2001) ISBN 0-684-81363-7.
