= John Adams Birthplace =

Historic house in Massachusetts, United States

- John Adams Birth Home
- U.S. National Register of Historic Places
- U.S. National Historic Landmark
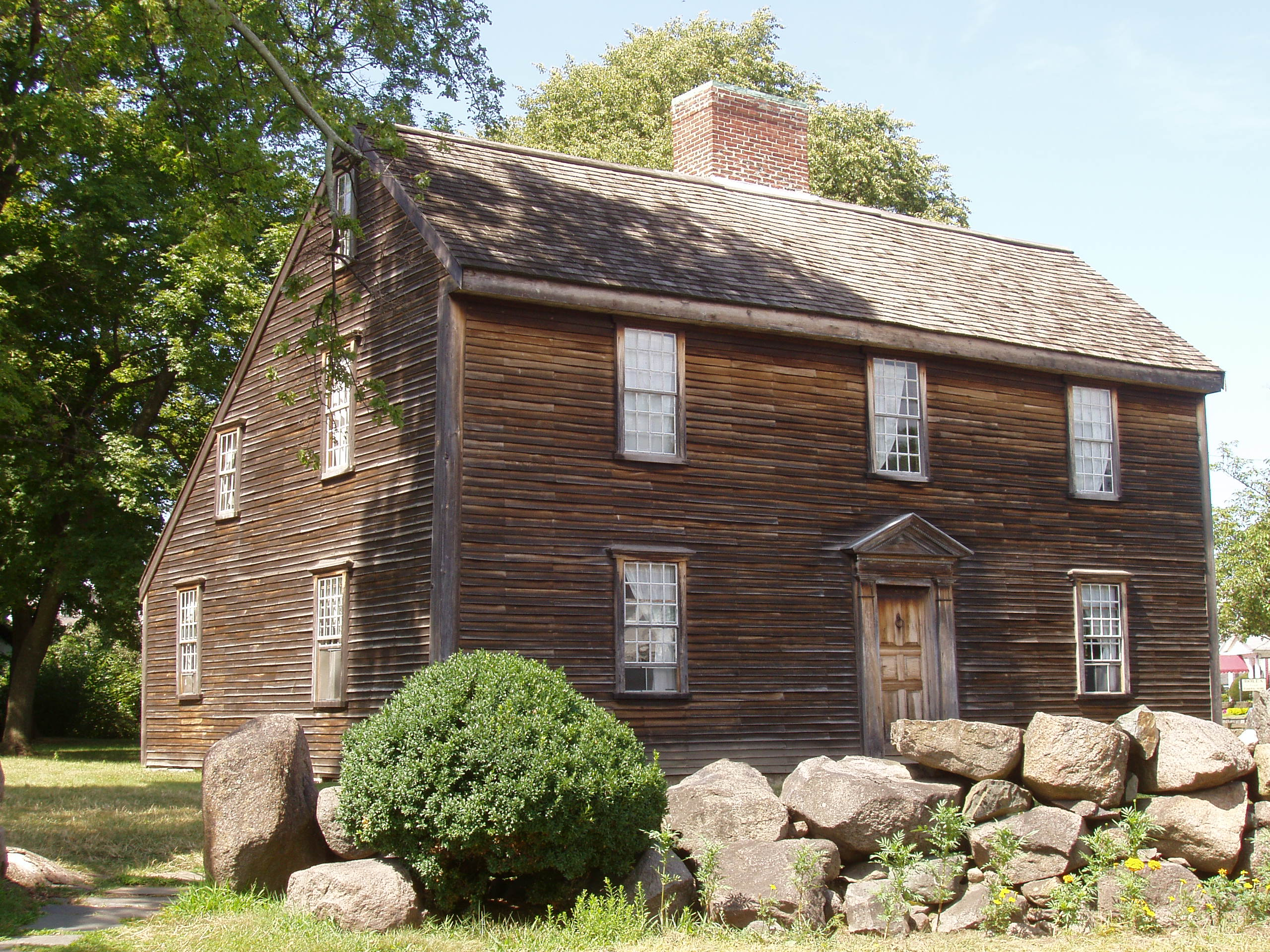
- Birthplace of President John Adams, Quincy, Massachusetts

- Location within Massachusetts Location within the United States
- Location: Quincy, Massachusetts
- Coordinates: 42°14′21.46″N 71°0′12.8″W
- Built: 1681
- NRHP reference No.: 66000129

Significant dates
- Added to NRHP: October 15, 1966
- Designated NHL: December 19, 1960

The John Adams Birthplace is a historic house at 133 Franklin Street in Quincy, Massachusetts. It is the saltbox home in which Founding Father and second president of the United States, John Adams, was born in 1735. The house was designated a National Historic Landmark in 1960, and is listed on the National Register of Historic Places. Along with the neighboring John Quincy Adams Birthplace, it is now administered by the National Park Service as part of the Adams National Historical Park, and is open for guided tours.

== Description and early history ==
The house, a 2 1/2 story wood-frame structure sheathed in wooden clapboards, is a classic New England home with two lower and two upper rooms built around a massive central chimney. Extensive alterations were made over the years, including the building of a lean-to in the 18th century that added two downstairs rooms and two small upper chambers. The main facade is three bays wide with the entry in the center. The doorway is framed by pilasters and topped by an entablature and triangular pediment.

The land on which the house sits was first owned by William Needham, who built a house on the property c. 1681. President John Adams refers to the fact that his father built the house in a letter to Benjamin Rush of July 19, 1812. The framing of the east side incorporates a number of reused timbers dating to the 1670s." John, the oldest son of Deacon John, was born in the east room on October 30 (October 19 O.S.), 1735.

== Later history ==
Upon the Deacon's death in 1761, the house passed to his second son, Peter; the elder John received the house next door, where John Quincy Adams was born to John and Abigail Adams in 1767. Peter lived in the house with his mother until 1768, when he married. In 1774 he sold the house to his brother John, who rented it out after their mother died in 1780. In 1803 John sold both houses to his son, who lived in the house of his birth, and rented this one out. The house was occupied from 1810 to 1818 by John Quincy Adams' son, Thomas Boylston Adams.

Both houses remained in Adams family ownership, and were rented out until 1885, when most of the surrounding farmland was sold off. After sitting vacant, Charles Francis Adams Jr. authorized the local chapter of the Daughters of the American Revolution to use the house as meeting space. This they did until the chapter folded in 1950. The Adamses sold the house to the City of Quincy in 1940, which turned administration of the property over to the Quincy Historical Society (which had earlier taken over the adjacent house) in 1950. The two houses are now part of Adams National Historical Park, and are administered by the National Park Service. They are open for guided tours.

== See also ==
- Peacefield, the major Adams house in the national park
- List of National Historic Landmarks in Massachusetts
- National Register of Historic Places listings in Quincy, Massachusetts
- Presidential memorials in the United States

== Gallery ==
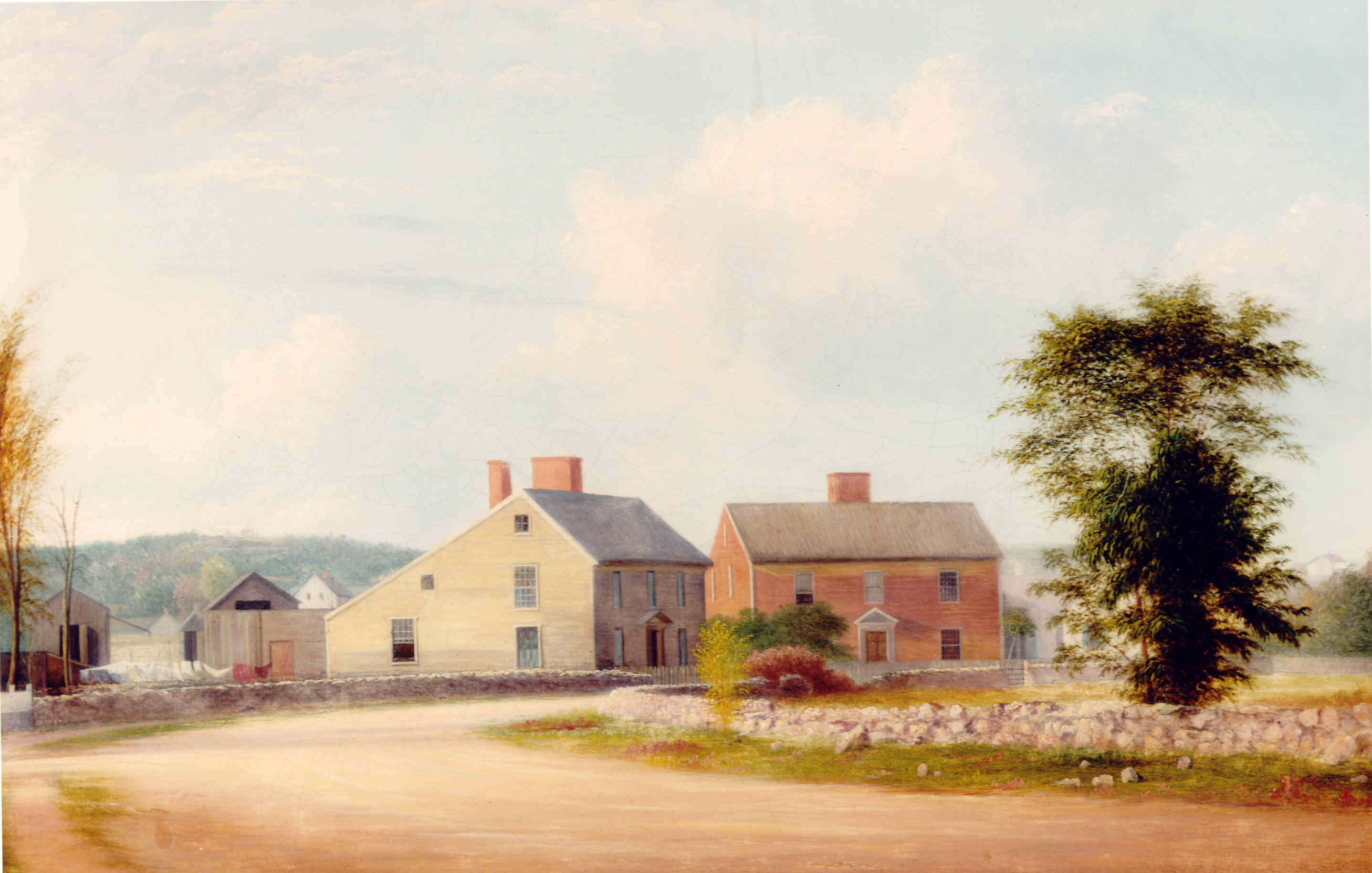
John Adams birthplace and the John Quincy Adams Birthplace

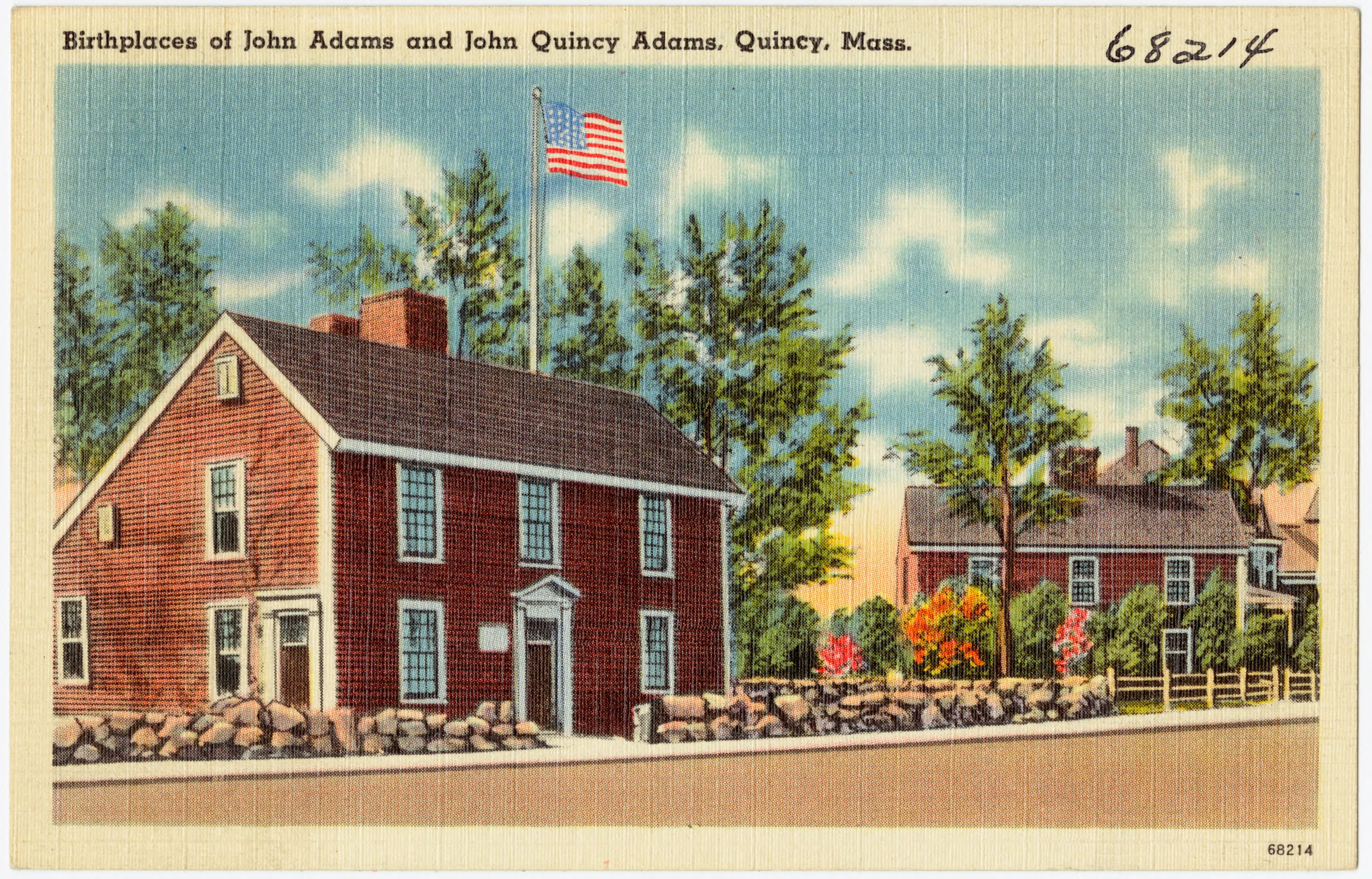
Birthplace of John Adams and John Quincy Adams
