= Edith B. Gelles =

American author and historian

- Born: Lake Placid, New York
- Education: Cornell University, Yale University, University of California, Irvine
- Occupations: Historian, author
- Writing career
- Language: English
- Period: Late 18th, early 19th century
- Genres: non-fiction, history
- Subjects: Revolutionary and early American history
- Notable awards: Herbert Feis Award, American Historical Association
- Website: Stanford University

Edith Belle Gelles is an American author and historian. She grew up in Lake Placid, New York, and attended Cornell University, Yale University, and the University of California, Irvine. She is currently a Senior Scholar at the Clayman Institute for Gender Research at Stanford University where she has been a faculty member since 1983. Her scholarship is primarily in the area of early American history, concentrating on biography and women. She is known for her scholarship and writing about Abigail Adams and her husband John.

== Publications ==
=== Books ===
- Portia: The World of Abigail Adams (1996) Indiana University Press. (Note: American Historical Association's Herbert Feis Award.)
- The Letters of Abigaill Levy Franks, 1733–1748: Letters of Abigaill Levy Franks 1733–1748 (2004) Yale University Press.
- Abigail and John: Portrait of a Marriage (2009) William Morrow.
- Abigail Adams: Letters (Edith Gelles, Ed.). (2016). Library of America.
- Abigail Adams: A Writing Life. (2017) Routledge.
- Gale Researcher Guide for John and Abigail Adams and the Revolution in Marriage (2018) Gale Publishing.

=== Journal articles ===
- Abigail Adams: Domesticity and the American Revolution. (1979). The New England Quarterly, 52(4), 500–521.
- A Virtuous Affair: The Correspondence Between Abigail Adams and James Lovell. (1987). American Quarterly, 39(2), 252–269.
- The Abigail Industry. (1988). The William and Mary Quarterly, 45(4), 656–683.
- Gossip: An Eighteenth-Century Case. (1989). Journal of Social History, 22(4), 667–683.
- Bonds of Friendship: The Correspondence of Abigail Adams and Mercy Otis Warren. (1996). Proceedings of the Massachusetts Historical Society, 108, 35–71.
- The Adamses Retire. (2006). Early American Studies, 4(1), 1–15.

== See also ==
- Colonial history of the United States
- History of women in the United States
