= Abigail Adams Cairn =

Coordinates: 42°14′1.80″N 70°59′51.14″W

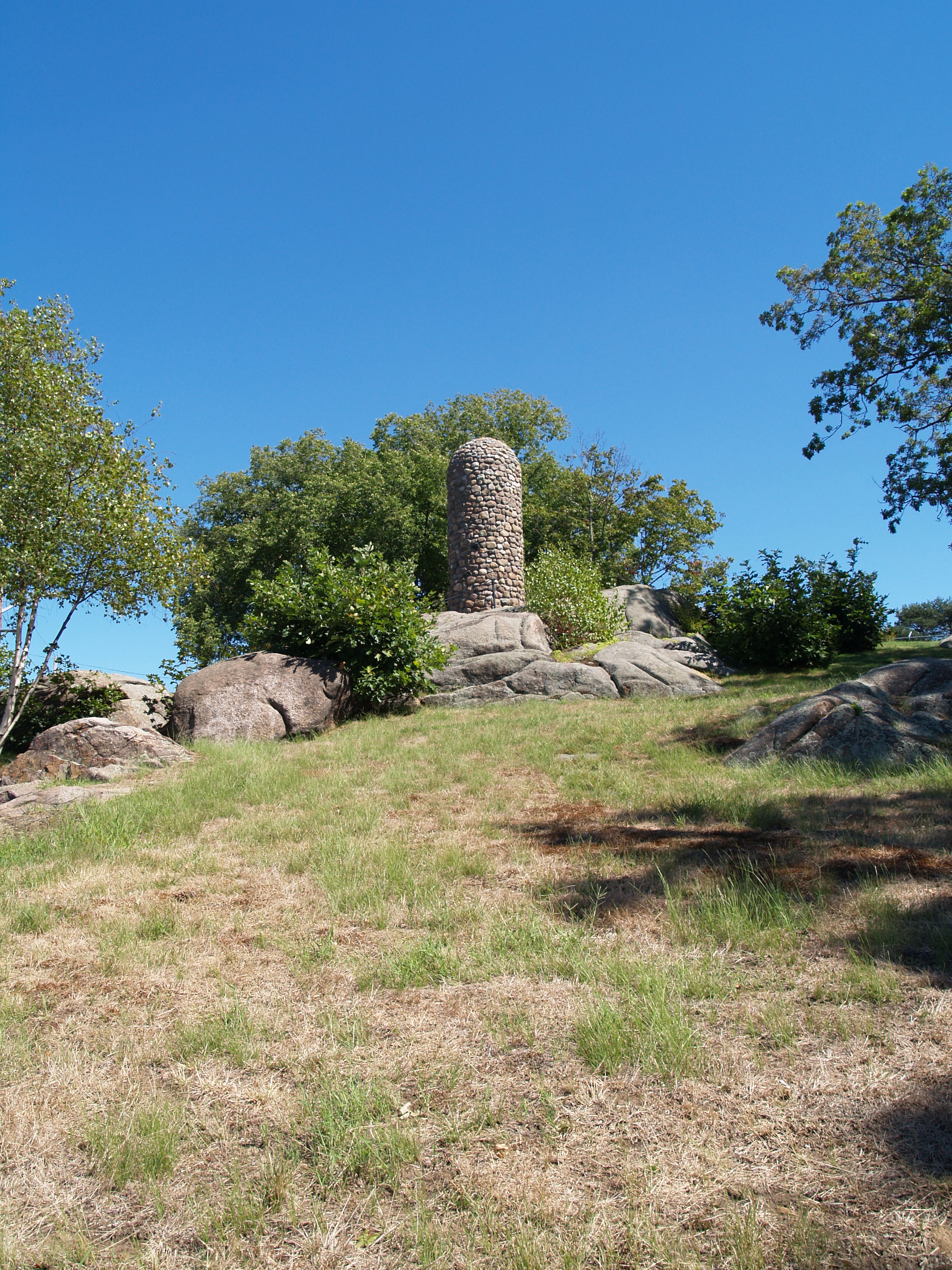
The Abigail Adams Cairn, Quincy, Massachusetts.

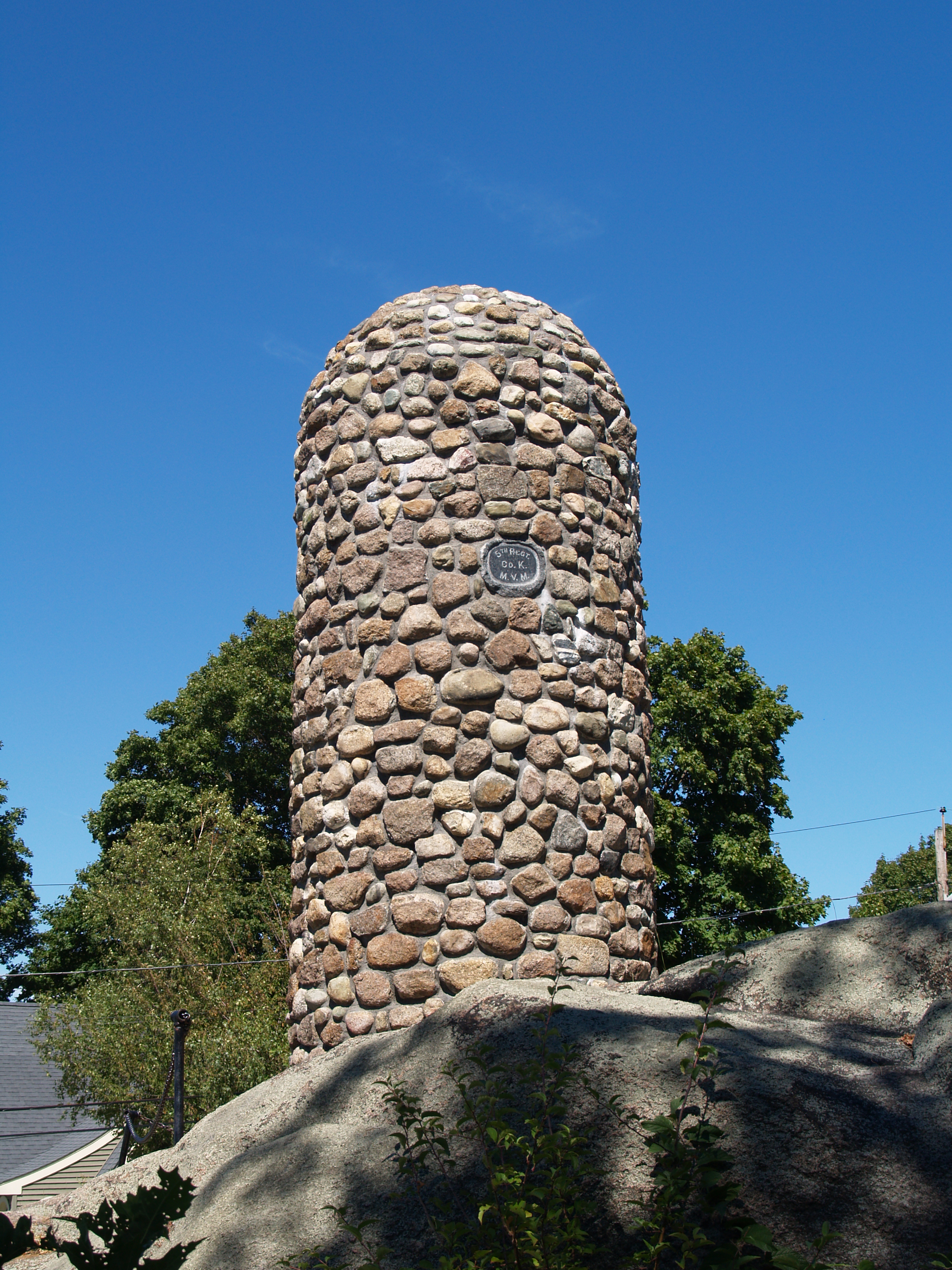
The Abigail Adams Cairn, Quincy, Massachusetts.

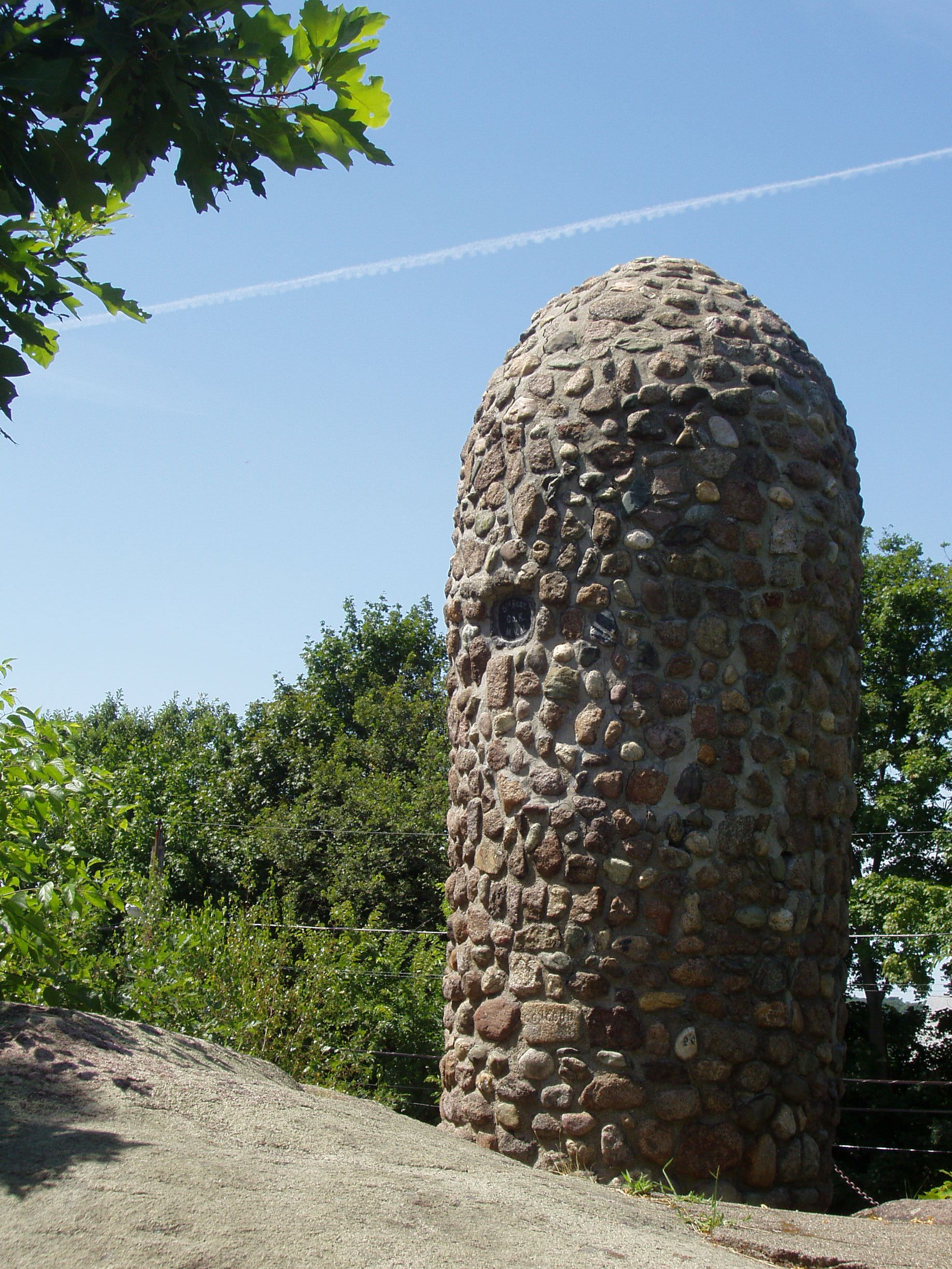
The Abigail Adams Cairn, Quincy, Massachusetts.

The Abigail Adams Cairn marks the spot where Abigail Adams and her young son, John Quincy Adams, watched the burning of Charlestown on Saturday, June 17, 1775, during the Battle of Bunker Hill. It is located on Penn's Hill, now at the corner of Franklin Street and Viden Road in Quincy, Massachusetts. Abigail was caring for the four children of Dr. Joseph Warren, then President of the Massachusetts Provincial Congress, as well as her own children, Nabby (age 10), John Quincy (7), Charles (5), and Thomas Boylston (3), when word came that Dr. Warren had been killed by British troops. In the afternoon, she walked up Penn's Hill to the rock outcroppings, taking her son John Quincy and Nabby along with her. There they looked out over the distant hills and shoreline, seeing the smoke of Charlestown and hearing the far-off rumble of guns and cannon at Bunker Hill.

The cairn was erected June 17, 1896, by the Adams Chapter of the Society of the Daughters of the Revolution. It contains various marked stones, including one inscribed Concord, another 5th Regt. Co. K., M.V.M., and From Bunker Hill Quarry, June 17, 1896. (The stone for the Bunker Hill Monument was quarried in Quincy.) Its builder was local stonemason John J. Stanton.

A time capsule was discovered inside the cairn in 2008.
