= Abigail Adams =

First Lady of the United States from 1797 to 1801

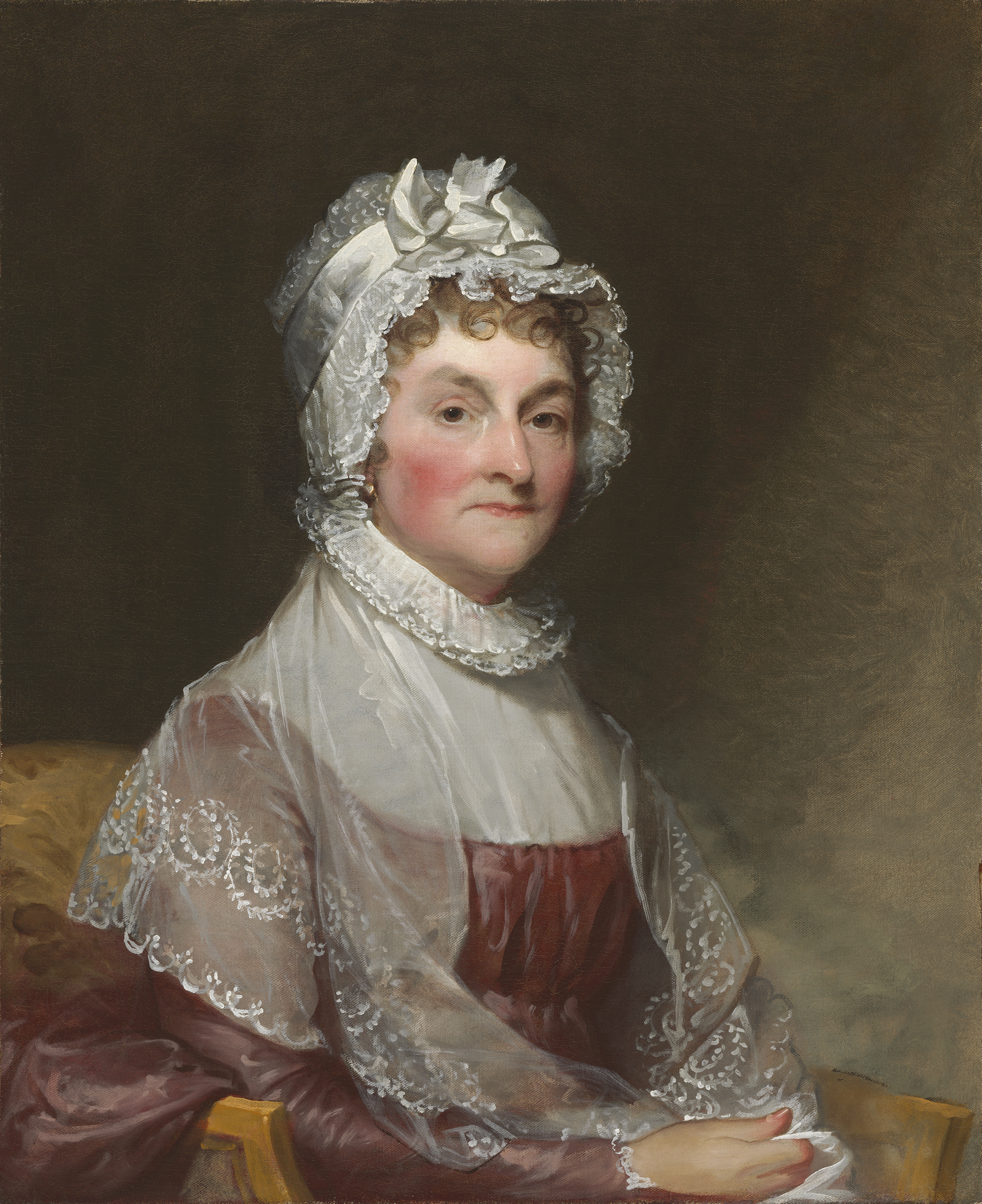
- Portrait by Gilbert Stuart, c. 1800–1815

First Lady of the United States
- In role March 4, 1797 – March 4, 1801
- President: John Adams
- Preceded by: Martha Washington
- Succeeded by: Martha Jefferson Randolph

Second Lady of the United States
- In role April 21, 1789 – March 4, 1797
- Vice President: John Adams
- Preceded by: Position established
- Succeeded by: Ann Gerry

Personal details
- Born: Abigail Smith; November 22, 1744 Weymouth, Massachusetts, British America
- Died: October 28, 1818 (aged 73) Quincy, Massachusetts, U.S.
- Resting place: United First Parish Church
- Spouse: John Adams (m. 1764)
- Children: 6, including Abigail, John Quincy, Charles, and Thomas
- Relatives: Adams political family Quincy political family

Abigail Adams (née Smith; 22 November [O.S. 11 November] 1744 – October 28, 1818) was the wife and closest advisor of John Adams, the second president of the United States, and the mother of John Quincy Adams, the sixth president of the United States. She is widely considered to be an influential figure in the founding of the United States, and was both the first second lady and second first lady of the United States, although such titles were not used at the time. She and Barbara Bush are the only two women in American history who were both the wife of a U.S. president and the mother of another U.S. president.

Abigail Adams's life is one of the most documented of the first ladies. Many of the letters she wrote to John Adams while he was in Philadelphia as a delegate in the Continental Congress, prior to and during the Revolutionary War, document the closeness and versatility of their relationship. John Adams frequently sought the advice of Abigail on many matters, and their letters are filled with intellectual discussions on government and politics. Her letters also serve as eyewitness accounts of the home front of the Revolutionary War.

Surveys of historians conducted periodically by the Siena College Research Institute since 1982 have consistently found Adams to rank as one of the three most highly regarded first ladies by historians.

== Early life and family (1744–1759) ==
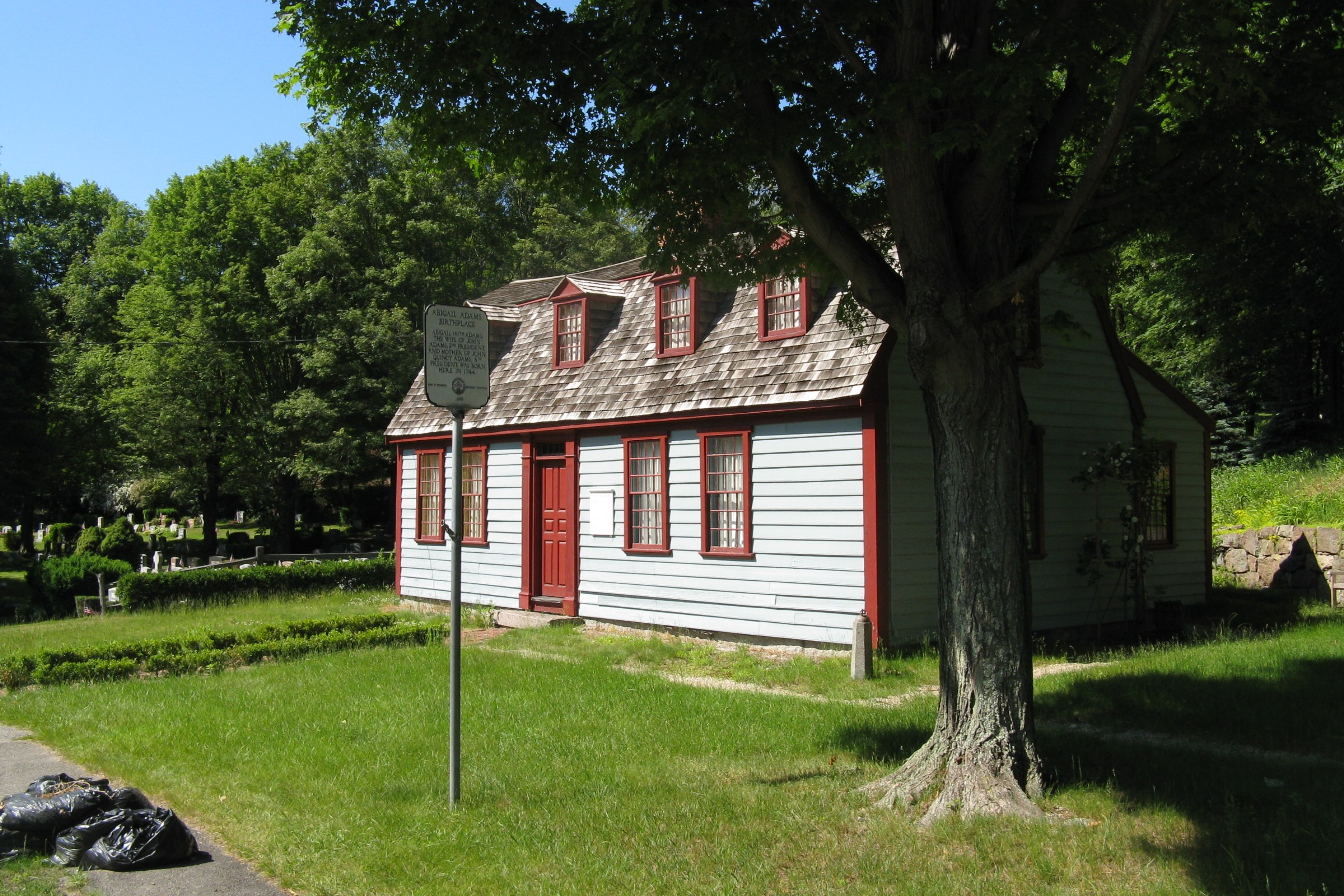
Abigail Adams's birthplace in Weymouth, Massachusetts

Abigail Adams was born on November 22, 1744, at the North Parish Congregational Church in Weymouth, Massachusetts, to William Smith and Elizabeth (née Quincy) Smith. On her mother's side, she was descended from the Quincy political family, a well-known political family in the Massachusetts colony. Through her mother she was a cousin of Dorothy Quincy, who was married to John Hancock. Adams was also the great-granddaughter of John Norton, founding pastor of Old Ship Church in Hingham, Massachusetts, the only remaining 17th-century Puritan meetinghouse in Massachusetts. Smith married Elizabeth Quincy in 1740, and together they had three daughters and a son; Abigail was the second child. As with several of her ancestors, Adams's father was a liberal Congregational minister: a leader in a Yankee society that held its clergy in high esteem. Smith did not focus his preaching on predestination or original sin; instead he emphasized the importance of reason and morality. In October 1775 his wife Elizabeth, with whom he had been married for 35 years, died. In 1784, at age 77, Smith died.

The Smith family were slaveholders and are known to have owned at least four people. A slave named Phoebe took a caretaking role to Abigail and other children; later on she would work as a paid servant for Abigail after she became free. Abigail would come to express anti-slavery beliefs as an adult.

Abigail did not receive formal schooling; she was frequently sick as a child, something which may have been a factor preventing her from receiving an education. Later in life, Adams would also consider that she was deprived an education because females were rarely given such an opportunity. Although she did not receive a formal education, her mother taught her and her sisters to read, write and cipher; her father's, uncle's and grandfather's large libraries enabled the sisters to study English and French literature. Her grandmother, Elizabeth Quincy, also contributed to Adams's education. As she grew up, Adams read with friends in an effort to further her learning. She became regarded as one of the most erudite women ever to serve as first lady.

== Marriage and children (1759–1783) ==
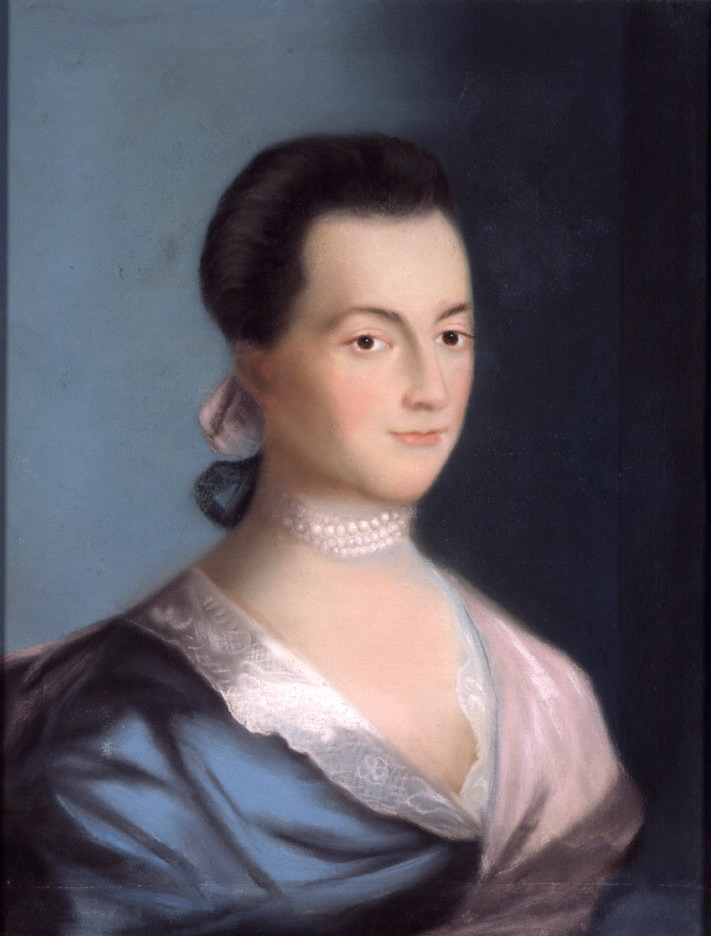
Abigail Smith Adams – 1766 portrait by Benjamin Blyth

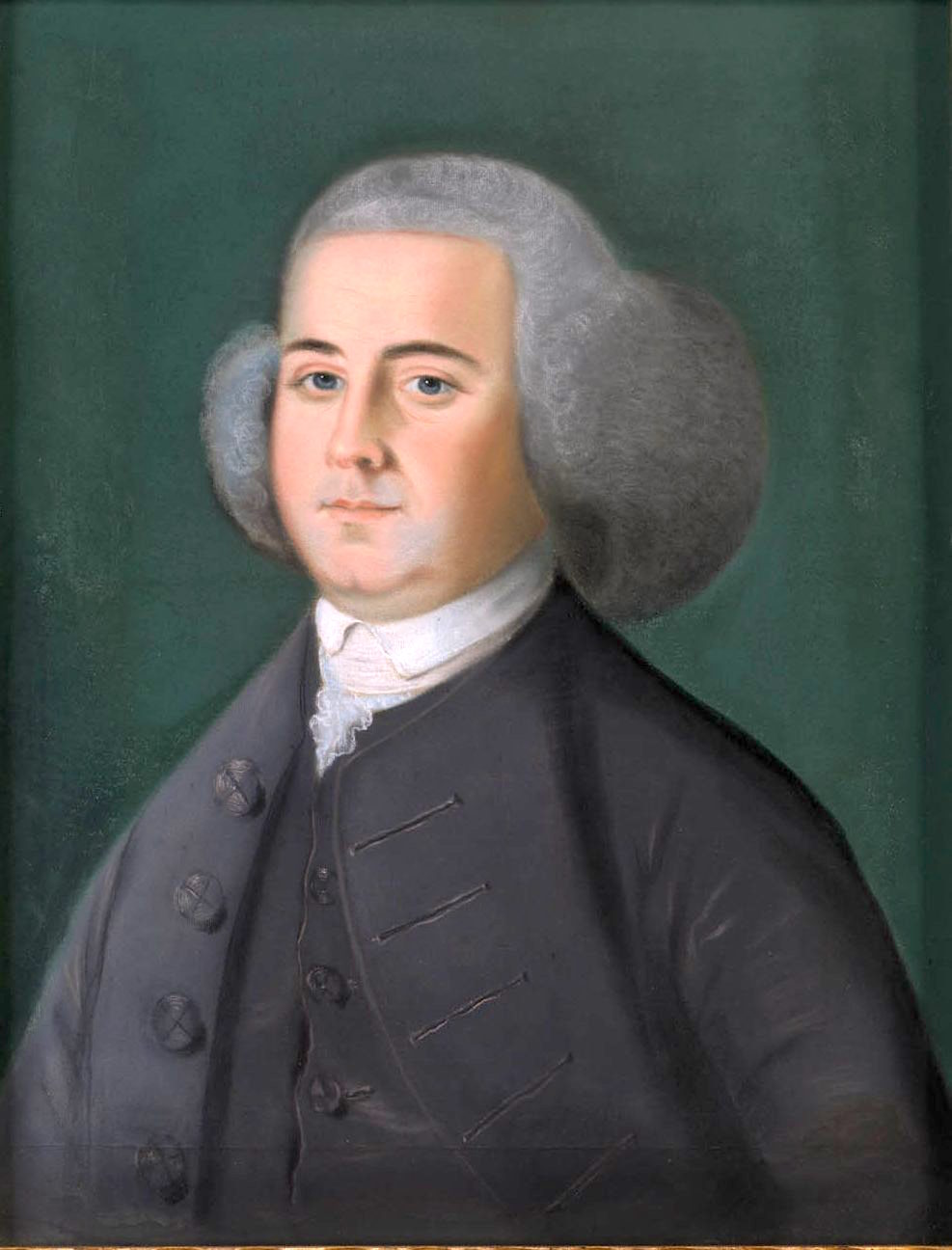
John Adams – 1766 portrait also by Blyth

Abigail Smith first met John Adams when she was 15 years old in 1759. John accompanied his friend Richard Cranch to the Smith household. Cranch was engaged to Abigail's older sister, Mary Smith, and they would be the parents of federal judge William Cranch. Adams reported finding the Smith sisters neither "fond, nor frank, nor candid."

Although Abigail's father approved of the match, her mother was appalled that her daughter would marry a country lawyer whose manner still reeked of the farm. Eventually, she gave in, and the couple married on October 25, 1764, in the Smiths' home in Weymouth. William Smith, Abigail's father, presided over the marriage. After the reception, the couple mounted a single horse and rode off to their new home, the saltbox house and farm John had inherited from his father in Braintree, Massachusetts (a location that is now part of Quincy). The couple welcomed their first child nine months into their marriage.

In 12 years, Abigail Adams gave birth to six children:

- Abigail ("Nabby"; 1765–1813)
- John Quincy (1767–1848)
- Susanna (nicknamed "Suky") (1768–1770)
- Charles (1770–1800)
- Thomas (1772–1832)
- Elizabeth (stillborn in 1777)

Her childrearing style included relentless and continual reminders of what the children owed to virtue and the Adams tradition. Adams was responsible for family and farm when her husband was on his long trips. "Alas!", she wrote in December 1773, "How many snow banks divide thee and me." Abigail and John's marriage is well documented through their correspondence and other writings. Letters exchanged throughout John's political obligations indicate his trust in Abigail's knowledge was sincere. Like her husband, Abigail often quoted literature in her letters. Historian David McCullough claims that she did so "more readily" than her husband. Their correspondence illuminated their mutual emotional and intellectual respect. John often excused himself to Abigail for his "vanity", exposing his need for her approval.

John Adams moved the family to Boston in April 1768, renting a clapboard house on Brattle Street that was known locally as the "White House". He and Abigail and the children lived there for a year, then moved to Cold Lane; still later, they moved again to a larger house in Brattle Square in the center of the city.

John's growing law practice required changes for the family. In 1771, he moved Abigail and the children back to Braintree, but he kept his office in Boston, hoping the time away from his family would allow him to focus on his work. Nevertheless, after some time in the capital, he became disenchanted with the rural and "vulgar" Braintree as a home for his family, and thus, in August 1772, Adams moved his family back to Boston. He purchased a large brick house on Queen Street, not far from his office. In 1774, Abigail and John returned the family to the farm due to the increasingly unstable situation in Boston, and Braintree remained their permanent Massachusetts home.

Abigail also took responsibility for the family's financial matters, including investments. Her investments made through her uncle Cotton Tufts in debt instruments issued to finance the Revolutionary War were rewarded after Alexander Hamilton's First Report on the Public Credit endorsed full federal payment at face value to holders of government securities. One recent researcher even credits Abigail's financial acumen with providing for the Adams family's wealth through the end of John's lifetime.

== Europe (1784–1788) ==
In 1784, Abigail and her daughter Nabby joined her husband and her eldest son, John Quincy, at her husband's diplomatic post in Paris. Abigail had dreaded the thought of the long sea voyage, but in fact found the journey interesting. At first, she found life in Paris difficult and was rather overwhelmed by the novel experience of running a large house with a retinue of servants. However, as the months passed, she began to enjoy herself: she made numerous friends, discovered a fondness for the theatre and opera, and was fascinated by Parisian women's fashions, although she ruefully admitted that she "would never be in the mode."

After 1785, she filled the role of wife of the first U.S. minister to the Court of St James's (Britain). In contrast to Paris, Abigail disliked London, where she had few friends and was, in general, cold-shouldered by polite society. One pleasant experience was her temporary guardianship of Thomas Jefferson's young daughter Mary (Polly), for whom Abigail came to feel a deep and lifelong love.

She and John returned in 1788 to their home in Quincy, Peacefield (also known as the "Old House"), which she set about vigorously enlarging and remodeling. It still stands and is open to the public as part of Adams National Historical Park.

== First Lady (1797–1801) ==
John Adams was inaugurated as the second president of the United States on March 4, 1797, in Philadelphia at the age of 61. Abigail was not present at her husband's inauguration as she was tending to his dying 89-year-old mother. When John was elected President of the United States, Abigail continued a formal pattern of entertaining. She held a large dinner each week, made frequent public appearances, and provided for entertainment for the city of Philadelphia each Fourth of July.

She took an active role in politics and policy, unlike the quiet presence of Martha Washington. Abigail was so politically active, her political opponents came to refer to her as "Mrs. President". As John's confidant, Abigail was often well informed on issues facing her husband's administration, at times including details of current events not yet known to the public in letters to her sister Mary and her son John Quincy. Some people used Abigail to contact the president. At times Abigail planted favorable stories about her husband in the press. Abigail remained a staunch supporter of her husband's political career, supporting his policies, such as passing the Alien and Sedition Acts.

Adams brought the children of her brother William Smith, her brother-in-law John Shaw, and her son Charles to live in the President's House during her husband's presidency because the children's fathers all struggled with alcoholism. Charles's daughter, Susanna, was just 3 years old in 1800 when Adams brought her to live in the President's House in Philadelphia days before Charles's death.

With the relocation of the capital to Washington, D.C. in 1800, she became the first First Lady to reside at the White House, or President's House as it was then known. Adams moved into the White House in November 1800, living there for only the last four months of her husband's term. At this time, the city of Washington D.C. was wilderness, with the President's House far from completion. She found the unfinished mansion in Washington "habitable" and the location "beautiful"; but she complained that, despite the thick woods nearby, she could find no one willing to chop and haul firewood for the First Family. Abigail used the East Room of the White House to hang up the laundry. Adams's health, never robust, suffered in Washington.

== Later life (1801–1818) ==
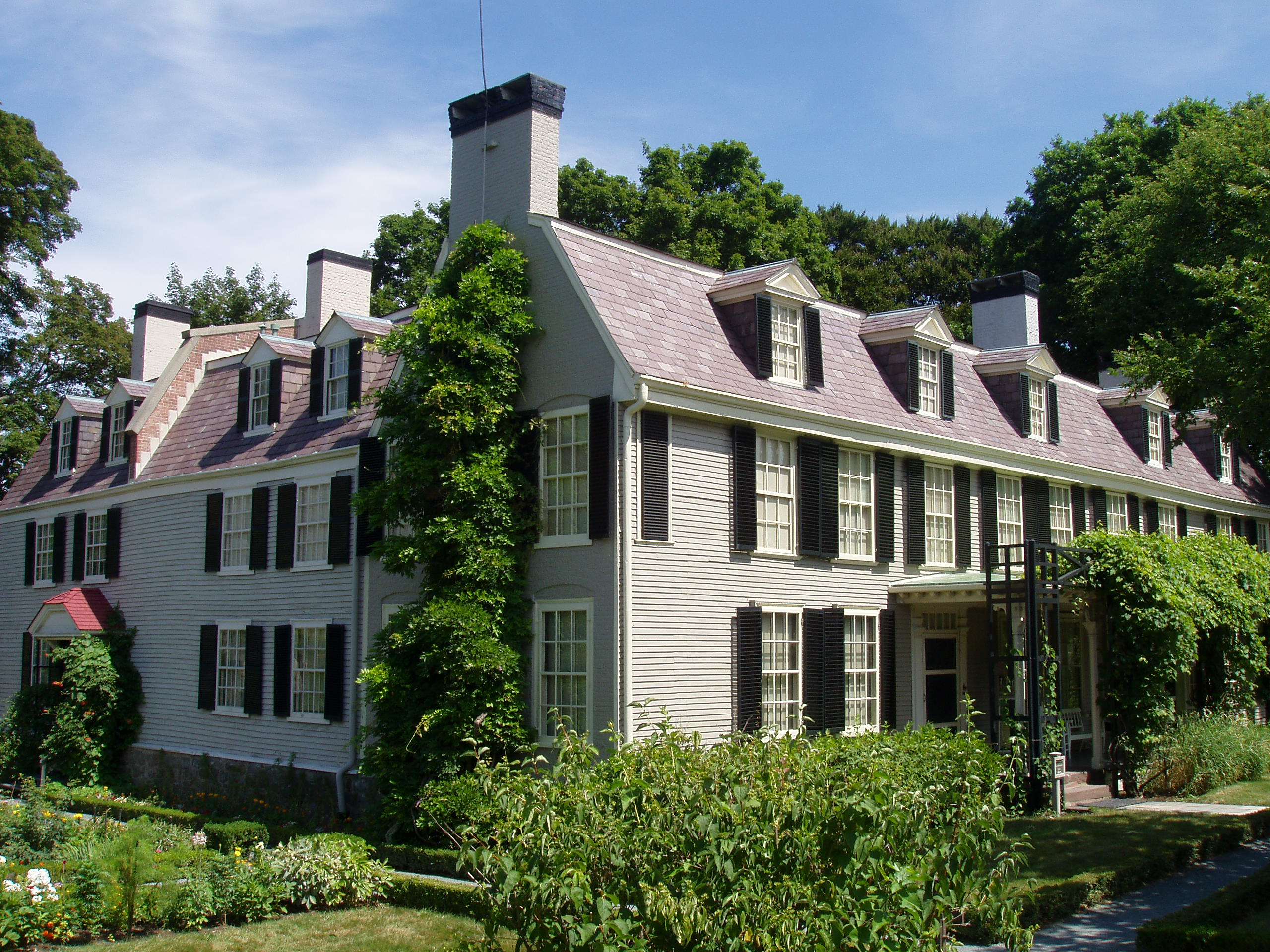
Abigail and John Adams moved back to Peacefield after John's presidency

After John's defeat in his presidential re-election campaign, the family retired to Peacefield in Quincy in 1800. Abigail followed her son's political career earnestly, as her letters to her contemporaries show. In later years, she renewed correspondence with Thomas Jefferson, having reached out to him upon the death of his daughter Maria Jefferson Eppes (Polly), whom Abigail had cared for and come to love when Polly was a small child in London, even though Jefferson's political opposition to her husband had hurt her deeply. She continued to raise her granddaughter Susanna. She also raised her elder grandchildren, including George Washington Adams and a younger John Adams, while their father John Quincy Adams was minister to Russia. Adams's 48-year-old daughter, Nabby, died of breast cancer in 1813, after having endured three years of severe pain.

== Death ==
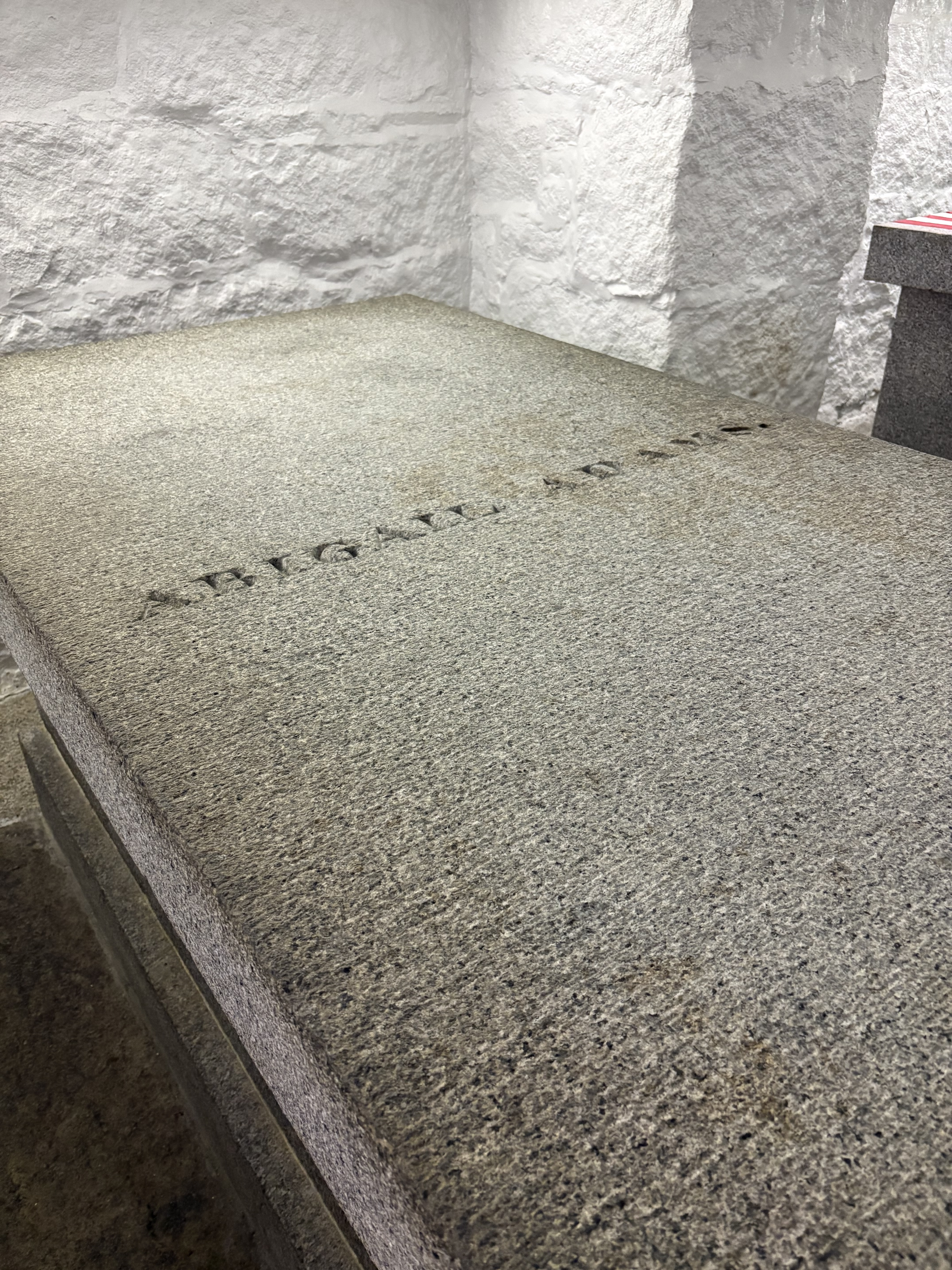
The tomb of Abigail Adams at United First Parish Church.

Abigail Adams became ill during her final years. She died in her home on October 28, 1818, of typhoid fever. She was buried in what was to become the family crypt, which now also holds her husband John, their son John Quincy, and John Quincy's wife Louisa, located in the United First Parish Church (also known as the "Church of the Presidents") in Quincy, Massachusetts. She was 73 years old, exactly two weeks shy of her 74th birthday. Her last words were, "Do not grieve, my friend, my dearest friend. I am ready to go. And John, it will not be long." Less than eight years later, on July 4, 1826, the fiftieth anniversary of the Declaration of Independence, her husband died of heart failure at the age of 90. He was buried next to her in the family crypt in the United First Parish Church.

== Political viewpoints ==
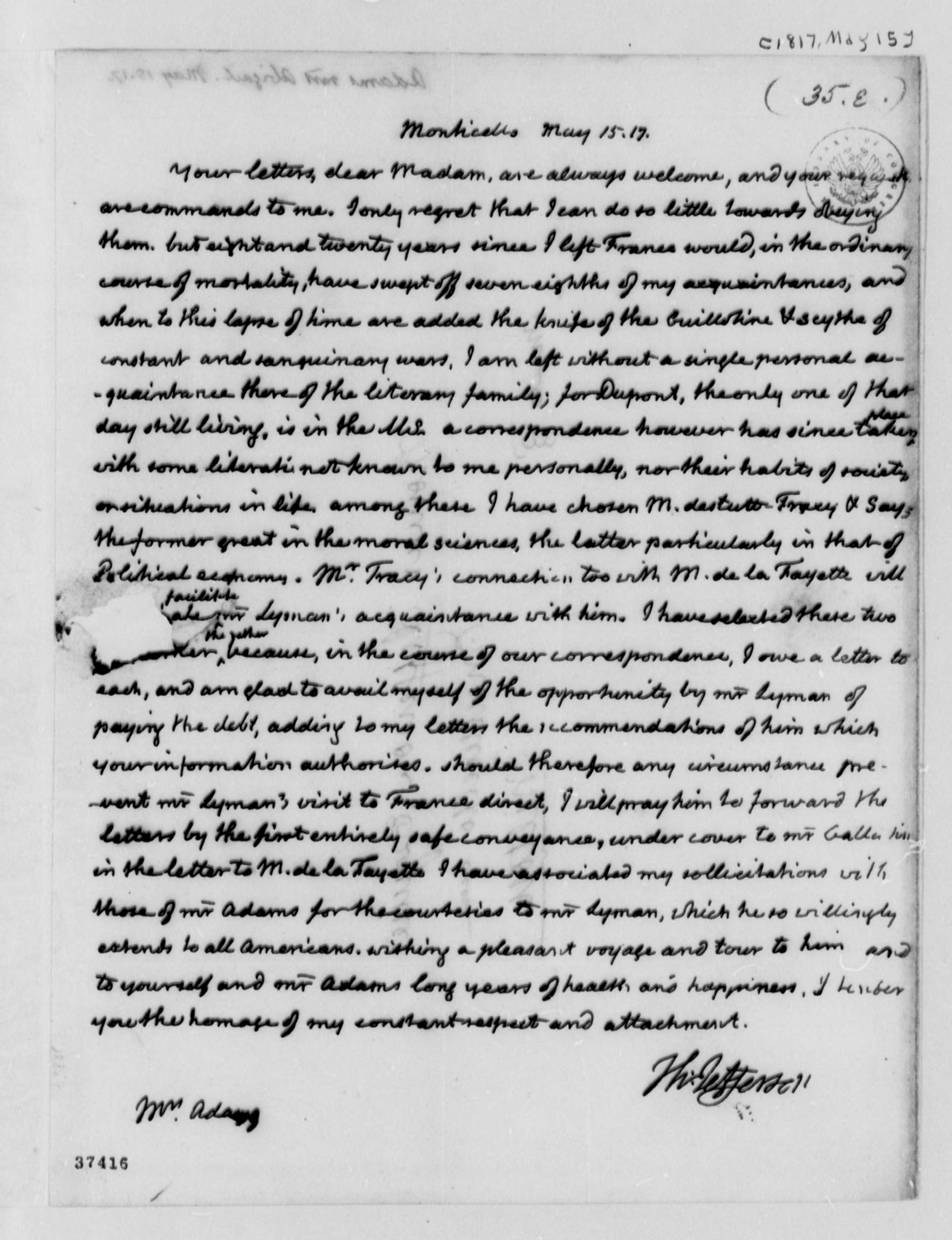
One of the last letters sent by Thomas Jefferson at Monticello to Abigail Adams, May 1817

Biographer Lynne Withey argues for her conservatism because she: "feared revolution; she valued stability, believed that family and religion were the essential props of social order, and considered inequality a social necessity". Her 18th-century mindset held that "improved legal and social status for women was not inconsistent with their essentially domestic role."

Despite believing firmly in women's domestic role, Abigail Adams advocated for women's rights in her letters to John Adams without reservation. Historian Edith Gelles writes, “she was venturing to use her influence as wife of an important politician to impact policy.” Elaine Forman Crane writes that Abigail "hesitated to confront her husband directly with the logical implications of his ideology… [but] did so circumspectly, surreptitiously, and with covert humor." Crane sees her confident tone as allowing her to discuss gender inequality while commanding respect and credibility within the patriarchal structure of the eighteenth century.

Furthermore, Abigail Adams was a firm believer that women are as qualified for political positions as men. Her letters demonstrate the belief that women have a mind just like men and should have a voice in politics. Abigail did not make comments about women in passing; rather, she understood the social standing and value of women and believed that by writing letters about her experiences, she was raising awareness for other women.

=== Women's rights ===
Abigail Adams wrote about the troubles and concerns she had as an 18th-century woman. She was an advocate of married women's property rights and more opportunities for women, particularly in the field of education. Women, she believed, should not submit to laws not made in their interest, nor should they be content with the simple role of being companions to their husbands; they should educate themselves and thus be recognized for their intellectual capabilities so they could guide and influence the lives of their children and husbands. She is known for her March 1776 letter to John and the Continental Congress, requesting that they, "remember the ladies, and be more generous and favorable to them than your ancestors. Do not put such unlimited power into the hands of the Husbands. Remember all Men would be tyrants if they could. If particular care and attention is not paid to the Ladies we are determined to foment a Rebellion, and will not hold ourselves bound by any Laws in which we have no voice, or Representation." Abigail’s famous remarks about remembering the ladies were not simply casual observations but also a part of a pattern in her correspondence that revealed her belief in women’s intelligence and their value in society.

John declined Abigail's "extraordinary code of laws", but acknowledged to Abigail, "We have only the name of masters, and rather than give up this, which would completely subject us to the despotism of the petticoat, I hope General Washington and all our brave heroes would fight."

=== Slavery and race ===
Adams opposed the existence of slavery in the United States and saw it as a threat to American democracy. In a letter she wrote on March 31, 1776, Adams doubted that the majority of White people in Virginia had such "passion for Liberty" as they claimed they did, since they "deprive[d] their fellow Creatures" of freedom.

One incident regarding Adams's views on race happened in Philadelphia in 1791, when a free black youth came to her house asking to be taught how to read and write. Adams subsequently placed the boy in a local evening school, though not without objections from a neighbor. Adams responded that he was "a Freeman as much as any of the young Men and merely because his face is black, is he to be denied instruction? How is he to be qualified to procure a livelihood? ... I have not thought it any disgrace to my self to take him into my parlor and teach him both to read and write."

== Religious beliefs ==
Adams was an active member of First Parish Church in Quincy, which became Unitarian in doctrine by 1753. Her theological views evolved over the course of her life. In a letter to her son near the end of her life, dated May 5, 1816, she wrote of her religious beliefs:

I acknowledge myself a unitarian – Believing that the Father alone, is the supreme God, and that Jesus Christ derived his Being, and all his powers and honors from the Father ... There is not any reasoning which can convince me, contrary to my senses, that three is one, and one three.

She also asked Louisa Adams in a letter dated January 3, 1818, "When will Mankind be convinced that true Religion is from the Heart, between Man and his creator, and not the imposition of Man or creeds and tests?"

== Legacy ==
Historian Joseph Ellis has found that the 1,200 letters between John and Abigail "constituted a treasure trove of unexpected intimacy and candor, more revealing than any other correspondence between a prominent American husband and wife in American history." Ellis concluded that Abigail, although self-educated, was a better and more colorful letter-writer than John, even though John was one of the best letter-writers of the age. Ellis argues that Abigail was the more resilient and more emotionally balanced of the two, and calls her one of the most extraordinary women in American history.

=== Memorials ===
External videos
- "First Lady Abigail Adams", First Ladies: Influence & Image, C-SPAN

The Abigail Adams Cairn – a mound of rough stones – crowns the nearby Penn Hill from which she and her son, John Quincy Adams, watched the Battle of Bunker Hill and the burning of Charlestown. At that time she was minding the children of Dr. Joseph Warren, president of the Massachusetts Provincial Congress, who was killed in the battle.

One of the subpeaks of New Hampshire's Mount Adams (whose main peak is named for her husband) is named in her honor.

In 2003, Adams was one of three women honored in a bronze sculpture as part of the Boston's Women Memorial on the Commonwealth Avenue Mall in Boston.

In 2022, a seven-foot tall bronze statue of Adams was unveiled in Quincy, Massachusetts, on the Hancock Adams Common.

An Adams Memorial has been proposed in Washington, D.C., honoring Adams, her husband, her son, and other members of their family.

=== Popular culture ===
Passages from Adams's letters to her husband figured prominently in songs from the Broadway musical 1776. Virginia Vestoff played Adams in the original 1969 Broadway production of 1776 and recreated the role for the film version in 1972. On television, Kathryn Walker and Leora Dana portrayed Adams in the 1976 PBS mini-series The Adams Chronicles. In the mini-series John Adams, which premiered in March 2008 on HBO, she was played by Laura Linney. Linney enjoyed portraying Adams, saying that "she is a woman of both passion and principle." A revolution-era Abigail, circa 1781, is portrayed by Michelle Trachtenberg, on the television series, Sleepy Hollow, in the season 2 episode, "Pittura Infamante" (January 19, 2015), her assistance being crucial in ending a series of unexplained murders from the period. Adams is a featured figure on Judy Chicago's installation piece The Dinner Party, being represented as one of the 999 names on the Heritage Floor. Novelist Barbara Hambly, writing as Barbara Hamilton, wrote three historical mysteries set in the early 1770s told from Abigail Adams's perspective (and featuring Abigail as the detective): The Ninth Daughter (2009), A Marked Man (2010), and Sup with the Devil (2011).

=== Portrait on currency ===
The First Spouse Program under the Presidential $1 Coin Program authorizes the United States Mint to issue half-ounce $10 gold coins and bronze medal duplicates to honor the first spouses of the United States. The Abigail Adams coin was released on June 19, 2007, and sold out in just hours. She is pictured on the back of the coin writing her most famous letter to John Adams. In February 2009 Coin World reported that some 2007 Abigail Adams medals were struck using the reverse from the 2008 Louisa Adams medal, apparently by mistake. These pieces, called mules, were contained within the 2007 First Spouse medal set. The U.S. Mint has not released an estimate of how many mules were made.

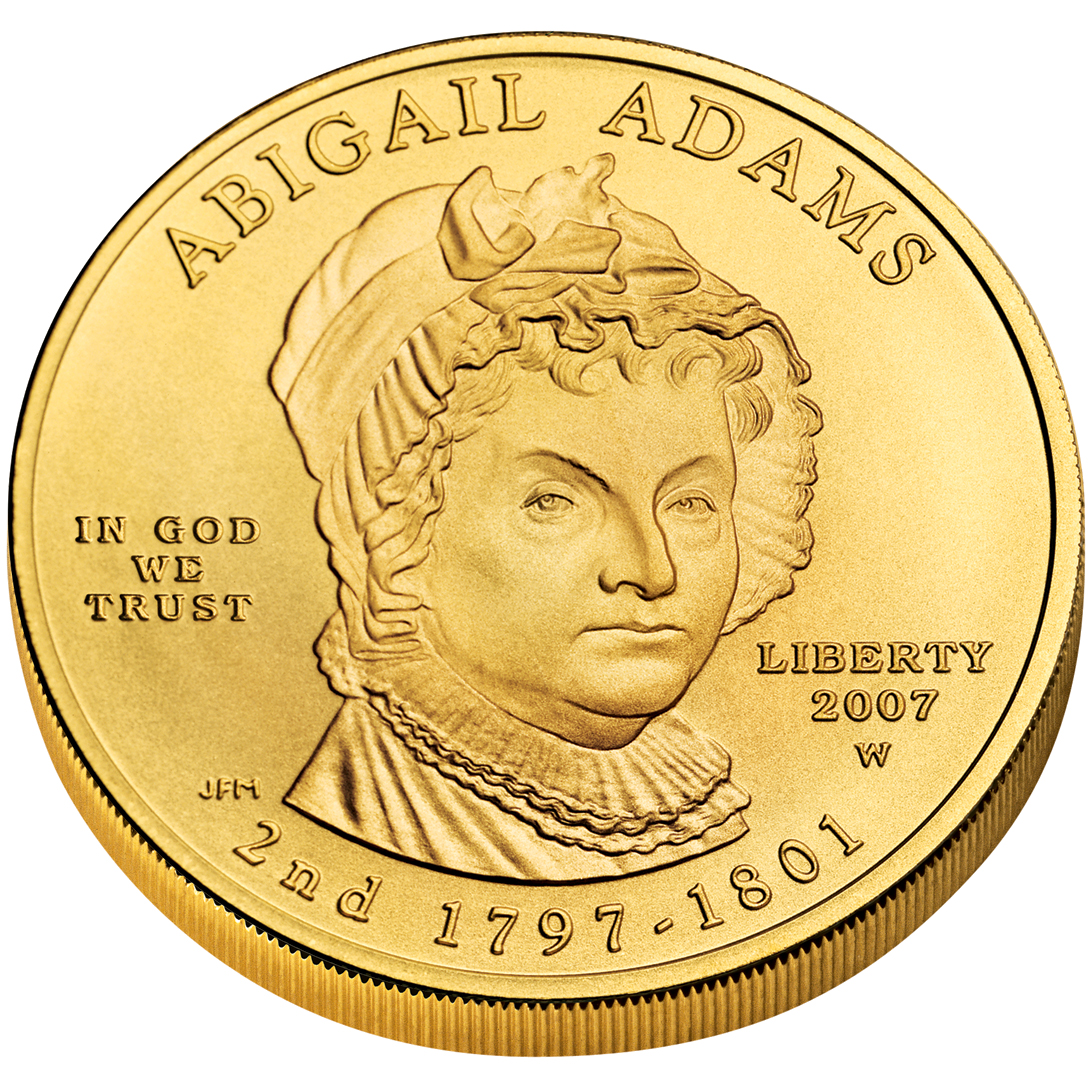
Obverse

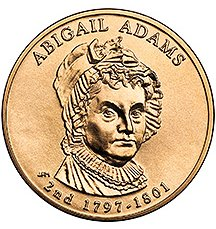
Obverse (bronze medal)

=== Regard by historians ===
Since 1982, Siena College Research Institute has periodically conducted surveys asking historians to assess American first ladies according to a cumulative score on the independent criteria of their background, value to the country, intelligence, courage, accomplishments, integrity, leadership, being their own women, public image, and value to the president. Consistently, Adams has ranked among the three-most highly regarded first ladies in these surveys, trailing only Eleanor Roosevelt (and in one instance, Hillary Clinton). In terms of cumulative assessment, Adams has been ranked:

- 2nd-best of 42 in 1982
- 3rd-best of 37 in 1993
- 2nd-best of 38 in 2003
- 2nd-best of 38 in 2008
- 2nd-best of 39 in 2014
- 2nd-best of 40 in 2020

In the 2008 Siena Research Institute survey, Adams was ranked in the top-four of all criteria, ranking the third-highest in of background, second-highest in intelligence, 3rd-highest in value to the country, third-highest in being her "own woman", second-highest in integrity, 3rd-highest in her accomplishments, 3rd-highest in courage, second-highest in leadership, fourth-highest in public image, and second-highest in her value to the president. In the 2014 survey, Adams and her husband were ranked the 5th-highest out of 39 first couples in terms of being a "power couple".

== Family tree ==
Adams family tree

John Adams (1735–1826)	Abigail Adams (née Smith) (1744–1818)
William Stephens Smith (1755–1816)	Abigail Amelia Adams Smith (1765–1813)	John Quincy Adams (1767–1848)	Louisa Catherine Adams (née Johnson) (1775–1852)	Charles Adams (1770–1800)	Thomas Boylston Adams (1772–1832)
George Washington Adams (1801–1829)	John Adams II (1803–1834)	Charles Francis Adams Sr. (1807–1886)	Abigail Brown Brooks (1808–1889)
Frances Cadwalader Crowninshield (1839–1911)	John Quincy Adams II (1833–1894)	Charles Francis Adams Jr. (1835–1915)	Henry Brooks Adams (1838–1918)	Marian Hooper Adams (1843–1885)	Peter Chardon Brooks Adams (1848–1927)
George Casper Adams (1863–1900)	Charles Francis Adams III (1866–1954)	Frances Adams (née Lovering) (1869–1956)	John Adams (1875–1964)
Henry Sturgis Morgan (1900–1982)	Catherine Lovering Adams Morgan (1902–1988)	Charles Francis Adams IV (1910–1999)	Thomas Boylston Adams (1910–1997)

== Bibliography ==
=== Secondary sources ===
- Abrams, Jeanne E. First Ladies of the Republic: Martha Washington, Abigail Adams, Dolley Madison, and the Creation of an Iconic American Role (NYU Press, 2018).
- Barker-Benfield, G.J. Abigail and John Adams: The Americanization of Sensibility (University of Chicago Press; 2010).
- Bober, Natalie S. 1995. Abigail Adams: Witness to a Revolution New York: Simon & Schuster Children's Publishing Division.
- Ellis, Joseph J. First Family: Abigail and John Adams (New York: Alfred A. Knopf, 2010).
- Gelles, Edith B. Portia: The World of Abigail Adams (Bloomington: Indiana University Press, 1991).
- ——. First Thoughts: Life and Letters of Abigail Adams (New York: Twayne Publishers, 1998), reissued as Abigail Adams: A Writing Life (London and New York: Routledge, 2002).
- ——. "The Adamses Retire". Early American Studies 4.1 (2006): 1–15.
- ——. Abigail and John: Portrait of a Marriage (New York: William Morrow, 2009) – finalist for the 2010 George Washington Book Prize.
- ——. "Bonds of Friendship: The Correspondence of Abigail Adams and Mercy Otis Warren". Proceedings of the Massachusetts Historical Society (1996), Vol. 108, p35-71.
- Holton, Woody. Abigail Adams: A Life (New York: Free Press, 2009) – winner of the 2010 Bancroft Prize.
- Henry Gardiner Adams, ed. (1857). "Adams, Abigail" . A Cyclopaedia of Female Biography: 6. Wikidata Q115290958 – via Wikisource.
- Jacobs, Diane. Dear Abigail: The Intimate Lives and Revolutionary Ideas of Abigail Adams and Her Two Remarkable Sisters. (2014)
- Kaminski, John P., editor The Quotable Abigail Adams (Cambridge, MA: Belknap Press of Harvard University Press, 2009).
- Levin, Phyllis Lee. Abigail Adams: A Biography (St. Martin's Press. 1987). 575pp
- McCullough, David (2001). John Adams. New York: Simon & Schuster. p. 144. ISBN 978-1-4165-7588-7.
- Nagel, Paul C. 1987. The Adams Women: Abigail and Louisa Adams, Their Sisters and Daughters. New York: {Oxford University Press}. ISBN 0-19-503874-6
- Orihel, Michelle. "Remember The Ladies: Teaching the Correspondence of John and Abigail Adams in the Age of Social Media". Common-Place: The Interactive Journal of Early American Life (2018) 18#1 p 3+
- Sawyer, Kem Knapp. Abigail Adams (2009) for secondary schools.
- Shields, David S., and Fredrika J. Teute. "The Court of Abigail Adams". Journal of the Early Republic 35.2 (2015): 227–235.
- Abigail Adams: Eyewitness to America's Birth (2009), for middle schools. Time magazine.
- Waldstreicher, David, ed. A Companion to John Adams and John Quincy Adams (2013).
- Winner, Viola Hopkins. "Abigail Adams and 'The Rage of Fashion'". Dress (Costume Society of America). 2001, Vol. 28, pp. 64-76.
- Withey, Lynne (1981). Dearest Friend: A Life of Abigail Adams.

=== Historiography ===
- Crane, Elaine Forman. "Abigail Adams and Feminism". in David Waldstreicher, ed. A Companion to John Adams and John Quincy Adams (2013) pp 199-
- Hogan, Margaret A. "Abigail Adams: The Life and the biographers". in David Waldstreicher, ed. A Companion to John Adams and John Quincy Adams (2013) pp 218–38.
- Wood, Gordon S. (May 12, 2011). "Those Sentimental Americans". New York Review of Books.

=== Primary sources ===
- Adams, Abigail. Abigail Adams: Letters (Library of America, 2016).
- Adams, Johns, and Abigail Adams. My Dearest Friend: Letters of Abigail and John Adams (2007); 556 pp
- Belton, Blair, ed. Abigail Adams in Her Own Words (2014)
- The Letters of John and Abigail Adams ed by Frank Shuffelton (2003).

Honorary titles
New title	Second Lady of the United States; 1789–1797	Vacant Title next held by Ann Gerry
Preceded by Martha Washington	First Lady of the United States; 1797–1801	Succeeded by Martha Randolph; Acting
