= Peacefield =

Home of U.S. presidents John Adams and John Quincy Adams

- U.S. Historic district – Contributing property
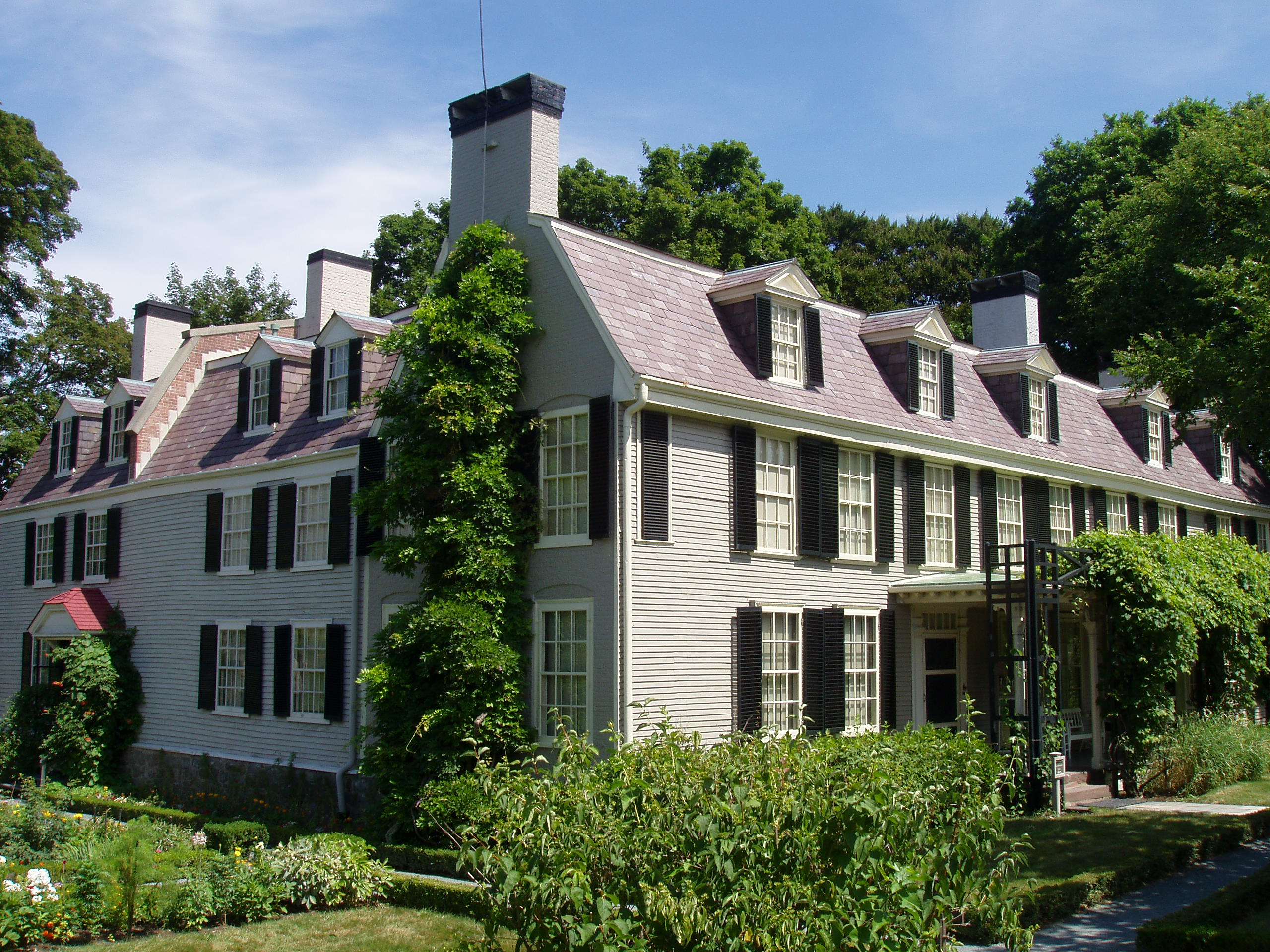
- The Old House at Peacefield at Adams National Historical Park

- Location within Massachusetts
- Location: 135 Adams St. Quincy, Massachusetts
- Coordinates: 42°15′22″N 71°0′39″W
- Built: 1731
- Part of: Adams National Historical Park (ID66000051)

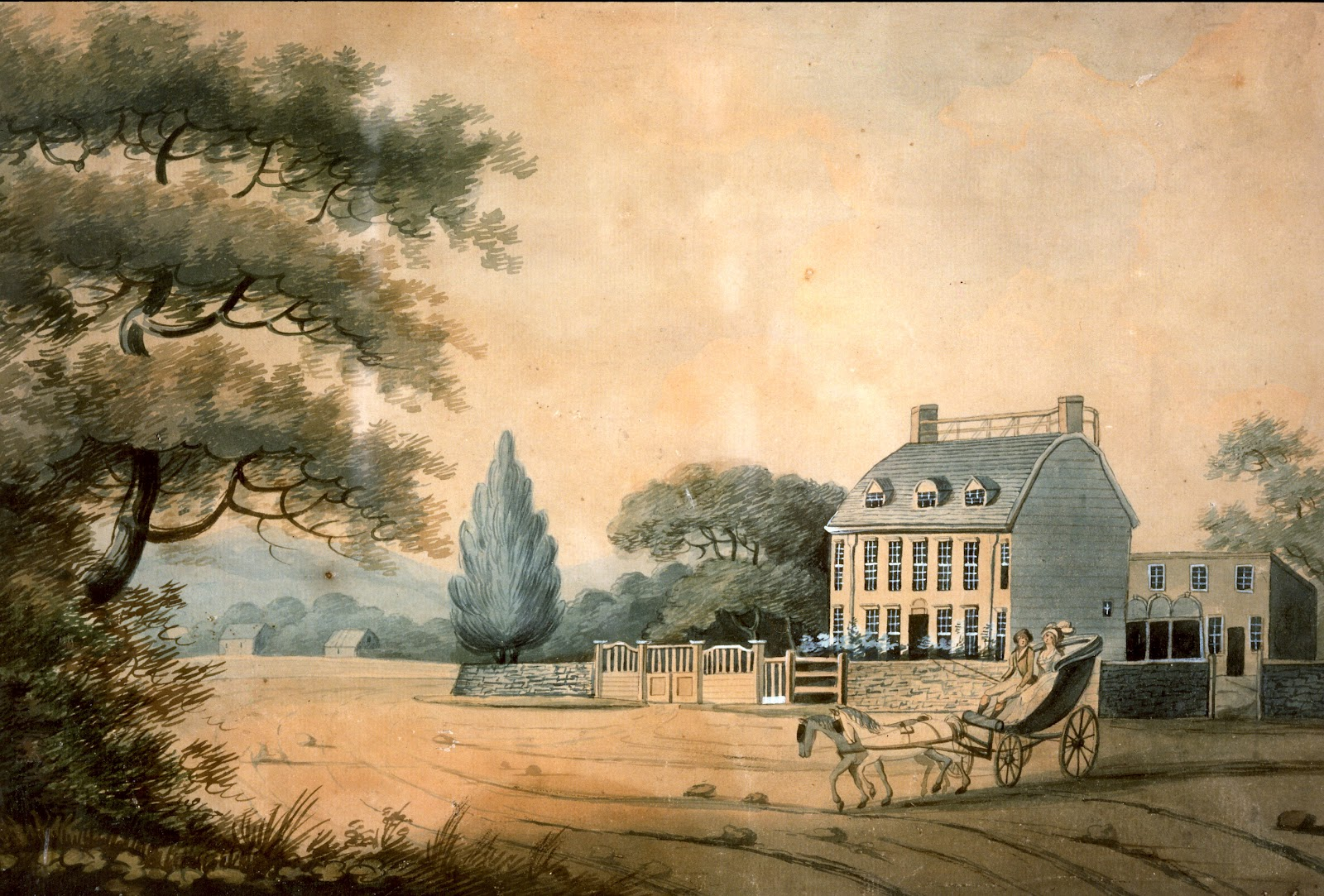
The mansion as it was in 1787 when bought by John Adams

Peacefield, also called Peace field or Old House, is a historic home formerly owned by the Adams family of Quincy, Massachusetts. It was the home of United States Founding Father and U.S. president John Adams and First Lady Abigail Adams, and of U.S. president John Quincy Adams and his First Lady, Louisa Adams. It is now part of the Adams National Historical Park.

The Stone Library requested by John Quincy Adams is directly next door. It was built by John Quincy's son Charles, a Peacefield resident, after the deaths of the two presidents.

== History ==
Peacefield was the home and farm of John Adams and his wife, Abigail Smith Adams. Later, it was also the home of John Quincy Adams, his wife Louisa Catherine Adams, their son Charles Francis Adams, and Charles' sons, historians Henry Adams and Brooks Adams.

=== Vassall era ===
The oldest portion of the house was built in 1731 as a summer house for Leonard Vassall (1678-1737), wealthy owner of slave-labor sugar plantations in Luana, New Savannah, and Green River, Jamaica. The two-and-a-half story frame house had a gambrel roof and separate kitchens with quarters for enslaved servants. Vassall's will names two of those enslaved on the property: Pompey and his wife Fidelia.

By Vassall's death in 1737, the estate in what was then Braintree included 60 acres of orchards, meadows, woodland, and farmland. The property passed to his second wife, Phebe Penhallow, who left it to their daughter, Anna Vassall Borland. A Loyalist, Borland leased the property during the Revolution. She reclaimed title in 1783 and sold it to her son, Leonard Vassall Borland (1759-1801). In 1787, he sold the estate for £600 to Boston agents acting for John Adams, then in England as the U.S. Minister to the United Kingdom.

The Adamses returned in 1788 to occupy the house, farmland, and orchards. They were disagreeably surprised by the house, however, after their years in England. To Abigail Adams, it resembled a 'wren's nest' with all the comfort of a 'barracks.'" They would call it "Old House."

=== Adams family ===
During the subsequent 12 years, with Adams resident in Philadelphia first as vice president and then as president, Abigail Adams attended to the house and farm. She greatly expanded it, adding what is now the right side of the front facade, with a fine hallway and large parlor on the ground floor and a large study above. The additions were built in the Georgian style with a gambrel roof creating a nearly full attic story. Adams returned to the house full-time in 1801 after his defeat for a second presidential term. His son John Quincy Adams also returned to the house at that time, after completing his ambassadorial term in Berlin. Further extensions to the house were made by his son, Charles Francis Adams.

=== National Park Service ===
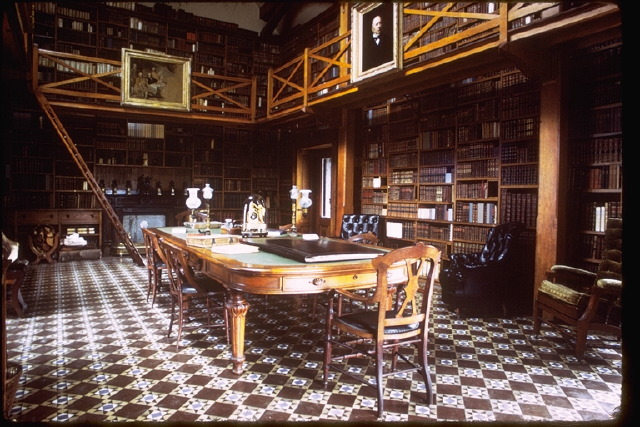
Interior of the Stone Library, a separate structure located next to the home

Brooks Adams, Charles Francis' youngest son, was the last member of the family to live at Peacefield. Upon his death in 1927, the house became a museum run by the Adams Memorial Society, until it was incorporated into the National Park Service in 1946.

The park later acquired nearby sites including the John Adams Birthplace and John Quincy Adams Birthplace, which together with the visitor center constitute Adams National Historical Park. United First Parish Church, where both presidents and their wives are buried, is nearby but not part of the park.

The family and the home are intertwined with the political and intellectual history of the birth of the American nation. Two older and smaller houses are located on the property, as well as the 1870 Gothic Revival Stone Library, which houses 14,000 volumes owned by John Quincy Adams. The property contains a historic orchard of heirloom apples, and formal 18th-century flower gardens.

== Furnishings ==
The house contains a variety of valuable furnishings and artifacts which belonged to the four generations of the family that lived there. Former park superintendent Wilhelmina Harris compiled a furnishings report, an inventory of all the artifacts in the house. Notable furnishings include John Adams' law desk and John and Abigail Adams' bed.

== Library ==
The stone library is a separate structure on the Peacefield grounds. The library was built in 1870 by Charles Francis Adams following the wishes of his father John Quincy, who had wanted to protect his books from "accidental conflagration." The library contains a large variety of books belonging to various members of the family, the largest portion belonging to John Quincy Adams. Notable books in the library include the Mendi Bible, a gift to John Quincy Adams after the Amistad case, and an early edition of the Book of Mormon given to Charles Francis Adams by Joseph Smith himself.

The library is built out of Quincy Granite. The city of Quincy is historically known for granite quarries.

In November 1996, a burglar broke into the library and stole several valuable artifacts including the Mendi Bible, two other bibles, and a text on fish. The artifacts were later discovered in a gym locker in Portsmouth, New Hampshire.

== Grounds ==
The property was originally a large farmland, much of which was sold by later generations who were no longer interested in farming. The Park now maintains a decorative garden which is largely restored to its appearance in the 1880s in Charles Francis Adams's era. The park grounds include the historic apple orchard behind the house, a greenhouse, and a carriage house that was used to house horses and carriages and contained an apartment for the coachman or other male servants.

== See also ==
- Adams National Historical Park
- List of residences of presidents of the United States
- Presidential memorials in the United States
