= Mendi Bible =

The Mendi Bible's front cover

The Mendi Bible

The Mendi Bible (also spelled Mende) is a Bible presented to John Quincy Adams in 1841 by a group of freed Mendi captives who had mutinied on the schooner La Amistad.

== History ==
in June 1839, 49 members of the Mende people in modern-day Sierra Leone were captured and put on the Spanish ship the La Amistad, destined for slavery in North America. The captives revolted and took ahold of the ship, however they ultimately landed in the hands of the United States Navy. Once in the United States, their legal status was unclear and they became the defendants of the Supreme Court case United States v. The Amistad.

Congressman John Quincy Adams, former president of the United States and known opponent of slavery, served as their attorney. Ultimately, the court ruled that the Mende captives were free and legally justified in their use of force to escape illegal enslavement, and the Mende defendants were able to prepare to go home.

Before leaving, the Mende defendants purchased an elegant copy of the Christian Bible with a gold-embossed cover and wrote a letter in it describing their gratitude and their friendship.

The letter of thanks reads in part:

We are about to go home to Africa. We go to Sierra Leone first, and then we reach Mendi very quick. When we get to Mendi we will tell the people of your great kindness. Good missionary will go with us. We shall take the Bible with us. It has been a precious book in prison, and we love to read it now we are free! Mr. Adams, we want to make you a present of a beautiful Bible! Will you please to accept it, and when you look at it or read it, remember your poor and grateful clients?...

For the Mendi people. CINQUE, KINNA, KALE.

Boston, Nov. 6, 1841.

== Legacy and preservation ==
The Mendi Bible is currently curated in the Stone Library next to the Adams' home, Peacefield, at the Adams National Historical Park in Quincy, Massachusetts. It is not always on public display.

The book was stolen from the Adams site in November 1996 and subsequently recovered by the FBI in a gym locker in Portsmouth, New Hampshire in January 1997.

Massachusetts Governor Deval Patrick, the state's first African-American governor, took his oath of office on the Mendi Bible on January 4, 2007, and took his second oath of office on the Mendi Bible on January 6, 2011.
