= Adam of Saint Victor =

12th-century Medieval French composer and poet

Adam of Saint Victor (Latin: Adamus Sancti Victoris; c. 1068 – 1146) was a prolific composer and poet of Latin hymns. A central figure of the sequences in high medieval music, he has been called "...the most illustrious exponent of the revival of liturgical poetry which the twelfth century affords."

Adam's career was based in Paris, split between the Abbey of Saint Victor and Notre Dame. He was well acquainted with numerous contemporary scholars and musicians, including the philosopher and composer Peter Abelard, the theologian Hugh of Saint Victor and the composer Albertus Parisiensis, the last possibly being his student.

== Life ==
Adam of Saint Victor was born in the late eleventh century; the musicologist Gustave Reese estimated c. 1068. He was most likely born in Paris, where he was educated. The first reference to him dates from 1098, in the archives of Notre Dame Cathedral, where he held office first as a subdeacon and later as a precentor. He left the cathedral for the Abbey of Saint Victor around 1133, probably because of his attempts at imposing the Rule of St Augustine at the cathedral.

Adam likely had contact with a number of important theologians, poets, and musicians of his day, including Peter Abelard and Hugh of St Victor, and he may have taught Albertus Parisiensis.

He lived in the abbey, which was something of a theological center, until his death

== Music and poetry ==
Adam of St Victor's surviving works are sequences for liturgical use, not theological treatises. (Note: These texts were gradually rediscovered in the nineteenth century.) (Note: The critical edition of these texts is Jean Grosfillier, ed, Les sequences d'Adam de Saint-Victor: Étude littéraire (poétique et rhétorique). Textes et traductions, commentaires, Bibliotheca Victorina 20, (Turnhout: Brepols, 2008), pp. 252-481. They are now fully translated in Adam of Saint-Victor, Sequences. Introduction, Text, Translation, and Notes by Juliet Mousseau, Dallas Medieval Texts, (Leuven: Peeters, 2011). In addition, Hugh Feiss, On Love, (2010), p71, argues that three additional Marian sequences seem likely to be by Adam of St Victor. The Latin text is in Bernadette Jollès, ed, Quatorze proses du XIIe siècle à louange de Marie, (Turnhout: Brepols, 1994).)

Jodocus Clichtovaeus, a Catholic theologian of the 16th century, published thirty-seven of his hymns in the Elucidatorium Ecclesiasticum (1516). The remaining seventy hymns were preserved in the Abbey of Saint Victor until its dissolution during the French Revolution. They were then transferred to the Bibliothèque Nationale, where they were discovered by Léon Gautier, who edited the first complete edition of them (Paris, 1858).

Around 47 sequences by Adam survive. In a practice that developed from the ninth century onwards, these are poems composed to be sung during the mass, between the Alleluia and the gospel reading. The sequence therefore bridges the Old Testament or epistle readings and the gospel, both liturgically and musically.

== Reputation ==
According to John Julian, "His principal merits may be described as comprising terseness and felicity of expression; deep and accurate knowledge of Scripture, especially its typology; smoothness of versification; richness of rhyme, accumulating gradually as he nears the conclusion of a Sequence; and a spirit of devotion breathing throughout his work, that assures the reader that his work is 'a labour of love'".

Anglican Archbishop Richard Chenevix Trench characterized Adam of Saint Victor as "the foremost among the sacred Latin poets of the Middle Ages".

In Mont Saint Michel and Chartres, Henry Adams wrote that Adam "aimed at obtaining his effect from the skillful use of the Latin sonorities for purposes of the chant".

The translator of medieval hymns, John Mason Neale, described Adam of St Victor as "to my mind the greatest Latin poet, not only of mediaeval, but of all ages".

== Editions ==
The modern critical edition of the Latin text is:

- Grosfillier, Jean (2008). Les séquences d'Adam de Saint-Victor: Étude littéraire (poétique et rhétorique), textes et traductions, commentaires. Bibliotheca Victorina 20. Turnhout: Brepols. ISBN 9782503526591.

English translations of Adam's work are in:

- Adam of St Victor (2013). Sequences. Dallas Medieval Texts and Translations 18. Juliet Mousseau (ed. and trans.). Leuven: Peeters. ISBN 9789042928954.
- Coolman, Boyd Taylor; Dale M. Coulter (2010). Trinity and creation: a selection of works of Hugh, Richard and Adam of St Victor. Victorine Texts in Translation 1. Turnhout: Brepols. ISBN 9782503534589. [includes translations of two of Adam of St. Victor's sequences in praise of the Trinity]
- On love: a selection of works of Hugh, Adam, Achard, Richard, and Godfrey of St Victor. Victorine Texts in Translation. Hugh Feiss (ed.). Turnhout: Brepols. 2011. ISBN 9782503534596. [includes translation of Adam of St Victor, Sequences]
- Wrangham, Digby Strangeways (1881). The liturgical poetry of Adam of St. Victor: from the text of Gautier, with translations into English in the original metres, and short explanatory notes by Digby S. Wrangham. London: Kegan Paul, Trench. Vol. 1, Vol. 2, Vol. 3
