= Mont Saint Michel and Chartres =

1904 work by Henry Adams

Mont Saint Michel and Chartres is a book written by the American historian and scholar Henry Adams (1838–1918). Adams wrote it well after his historical masterpiece, The History of the United States of America (1801–1817). Whereas the latter is a serious academic work of history, Mont Saint Michel and Chartres is far more whimsical, a playful meditative reflection on medieval culture. It was published privately in 1904, originally intended simply for his nieces; in 1913, it was made more widely available when published with the support of the American Institute of Architects. Despite having a far less serious intent than his earlier historical writings, Mont Saint Michel and Chartres has garnered high praise: for example, Maurice le Briton said, "Mont-Saint-Michel and Chartres is undoubtedly Adams's greatest work; though not apparently related to his earlier writings, this inspired work of poetry is the crowning achievement of his severe and somber historical oeuvre." A few years after Adams published Mont Saint Michel and Chartres, he published his most famous work, the Education of Henry Adams in 1907.

== Style ==
Superficially, the book is framed as a travel journal. Adams uses the metaphor of tour throughout the book, and refers to the readers as "tourists," but the tour is less one of a landscape and more one of a worldview. While Adams clearly knows a great deal of history of the period, his aim is not further historical investigation, but rather an almost poetic understanding of that worldview. He wrote: "All these schools had individual character, and all have charm; but we have set out to go from Mont Saint Michel to Chartres in three centuries, the eleventh, the twelfth, and the thirteen, trying to get, on the way, not technical knowledge; not correct views on either history, art, or religion; not anything that can possibly be useful or instructive; but only a sense of what those centuries had to say, and a sympathy with their ways of saying it."

== Plan ==
The first chapter treats the Mont Saint Michel Abbey: its architectural history as well as what the building and its patron represented for the people of that time. The second chapter concerns the great medieval epic Le Chanson de Roland, a poem which, Adams argued, "expressed the masculine and military passions of the Archangel" represented by that first cathedral. Most of the central section of the book, Chapters V – XIII, contains an extended analysis of the Chartres Cathedral, including the architecture and the royal patrons who supported various features. Through much of this, he speaks of the Virgin as a queen whose preferences are expressed in the cathedral, in each chapter extending the analogy further. By chapter XIII, Adams demonstrates how central worship of the Virgin was to the religion of the time: "True it was, although one should not say it jestingly, that the Virgin embarrassed the Trinity; and perhaps this was the reason, behind all the other excellent reasons, why men loved and adored her with a passion such as no other deity has ever known ..." The last three chapters take up purely philosophical topics. Chapter XIV focuses on the turbulent career of the gifted scholar Peter Abelard. Chapter XV, focuses on the mystics, principally the poet Adam of St. Victor and St. Francis of Assisi. In the final chapter, he focuses on St. Thomas Aquinas, drawing an extensive comparison between the Church Intellectual that Aquinas built and the Church Architectural that the mason had built. "St. Thomas' Church was the most expressive that man ever made, and the great gothic cathedrals were its most complete expression." Ultimately, Adams regards Aquinas as a "great artist."

== Bibliography ==
- Adams, Henry. Democracy, Esther, Mont Saint Michel and Chartres, The Education of Henry Adams. Library of America, Vol. 14.
