= Charlotte Everett Hopkins =

American philanthropist (1851–1935)

- Charlotte Everett Hopkins, from a 1936 publication
- Born: Charlotte Everett Wise; June 7, 1851; Cambridge, Massachusetts, U.S.
- Died: September 6, 1935 (aged 84); Gloucester, Massachusetts, U.S.
- Occupations: Philanthropist, social reformer
- Spouse: Archibald Hopkins
- Father: Henry Augustus Wise
- Relatives: Edward Everett (grandfather); William Everett (uncle); Peter Chardon Brooks (great-grandfather); Mark Hopkins (father-in-law); Henry Hopkins (brother-in-law)

Charlotte Everett Wise Hopkins (June 7, 1851 – September 6, 1935) was an American philanthropist and social reformer. She was president of the Home for Incurables in Washington, D.C. for over forty years.

== Early life and education ==
Charlotte Everett Wise was born in Cambridge, Massachusetts and raised in Washington, D.C., the daughter of Henry Augustus Wise and Charlotte Brooks Everett Wise. Her father was a captain in the United States Navy. Her grandfather Edward Everett was governor of Massachusetts and United States Secretary of State; her uncle William Everett was head of Adams Academy. Her maternal great-grandfather was Massachusetts businessman Peter Chardon Brooks.

== Career ==
Hopkins was "one of Washington's most public-spirited and philanthropic women." She was president of the nonsectarian Home for Incurables in Washington, D.C. for over forty years, and served on the board of the United States Hospital for the Insane. She was vice-president of the Monday Evening Club. She led fundraising for the Ellen Wilson Memorial Homes, a planned housing renewal project in Washington. Despite some public interest in 1914, the plan was shelved. During World War I, Hopkins was chair of the Woman's Department of the National Civic Federation, District of Columbia Section, and worked on coordinating women's war relief efforts, for example collecting donations of linen for surgical use, or providing family assistance for the dependents of military personnel.

In March 1933, in her eighties, she gave new First Lady Eleanor Roosevelt a tour of Washington's neighborhoods, and is credited with helping to create the Alley Dwelling Authority in 1934, to improve sanitation and housing in the city.

Hopkins was president of the George Washington Memorial Association, and vice-president of the Washington Animal Rescue League. She donated her uncle William Everett's papers to the Massachusetts Historical Society. After her husband died, she donated a Confederate sword, that he had kept from the war, to the Confederate Museum in Richmond.

== Publications ==
- "A Report Concerning the Colored Women of the South" (1896, with Elizabeth Christophers Kimball Hobson)
- "The Washington Alley Bill" (1914)

== Personal life and legacy ==
Wise married lawyer, writer, and Union Army veteran Archibald Hopkins in 1878. Her husband's father was theologian Mark Hopkins, and his brother was pastor Henry Hopkins. They had four children; a son died in 1889, and a daughter died in 1912. Her husband died in 1926, and she died in 1935, at the age of 84, in Gloucester, Massachusetts. Her grave is with her husband's, in Arlington National Cemetery. The Library of Congress has the Charlotte Everett Hopkins Collection of National Civic Federation, Woman's Department, District of Columbia Section Records.
