= Alley Dwelling Authority =

Housing authority in Washington, D.C.

The District of Columbia Alley Dwelling Act (48 Stat. 930) established the National Capital Housing Authority (NCHA) as “The Authority” on June 12, 1934. Executive Order 6868 (October 9, 1934) renamed the agency as the Alley Dwelling Authority (ADA), designated its membership, and outlined its functions.

Originally, the Authority confined its activities to slum reclamation in squares in the District of Columbia containing inhabited alleys. At the time the Authority began its operations, there were approximately 200 such squares. Under the Act, the Authority could redevelop an alley square for any purpose that served the interest of the city. Because many of these squares were not adapted to low-rent housing, the Authority sought amendments that would enable it to build dwellings for low-income families equal in number to those displaced by its slum reclamation on other sites. In the meantime, the Housing Act of 1937 was passed. At the next session of Congress, the Authority secured the desired amendments to its act and was authorized to borrow from the United States Housing Authority on the same terms as local housing authorities in other cities.

With the beginning of World War II, the Authority temporarily suspended its work and concentrated attention on providing additional dwellings for defense workers and, later, for war workers. But expansion of military facilities, such as the Navy Yard and a military highway, displaced resident low-income families and necessitated provisions be made for these people. Executive Order 9344, of May 21, 1943, established the authority as an independent agency and changed the name to National Capital Housing Authority (NCHA).

After the war, NCHA continued as the public housing agency for the District of Columbia, attempting to provide an adequate supply of proper housing for low-income families and individuals. In addition to building and acquiring housing, the Authority managed and maintained the properties as well as provided social services, such as day care, tutoring and recreational activities, for residents. On March 13, 1968, by Executive Order No. 11401, the President designated the Commissioner of the District of Columbia as the Authority to carry out the provisions of the District of Columbia Alley Dwelling Act. The Executive Order stated that in carrying out his functions as such Authority, the Commissioner would be known as the “National Capital Housing Authority”.

The District of Columbia Home Rule Act (87 Stat. 779) of December 24, 1973, abolished the agency, effective July 1, 1974.

== Actions ==
The ADA was ostensibly given the task of evaluating homes and streets to see if they met proper living conditions, but also had the power to condemn any building within a block as long as an alley dwelling existed on that block. Specific documentation would state the reasons why the area needed to be renovated. This documentation would then be sent from the authority to legislation for approval. Individuals in legislation included (but not exclusively) Eleanor Roosevelt. Common reasons as to why an area needed to be renovated were: excess of individuals in one home, too many African Americans in and around the area, or a fading exterior. After the ADA gained approval from legislation, it would then give the occupants of the houses anywhere from two to four months to find a new home. By July 1, 1944, all of the houses in Foggy Bottom had been evacuated and plans were set forward for renovation. This act sought to produce larger living spaces for individuals with better conditions, so that the owners could charge more for rent. Higher rent prices were acceptable at the time because of a boom in available jobs, which created a more competitive supply and demand market for housing. Monthly rent usually ranged anywhere from 17 to 37 dollars. These prices fluctuated often because of the available jobs and the condition of the houses. Older houses were typically cheaper than new homes, some of which had running water, gas heaters and cooling systems. Statistics suggest that, on average, the greater wealth arose from the majority of white residents, but also that Black wealth was steadily increasing due to new job patterns.

== Impact ==
In the process of attempting to improve upon DC living standards, the ADA demolished entire alleys. By tearing down the houses of alley dwellers, the ADA was able to refurbish the area into better houses.

Funding for the new houses came from the United States Housing Authority. The two loans that were made amounted to a total of $6,000,000 and $4,258,000. However, the construction meant that alley dwellers whose houses were being fixed would have no place to live. Of the five completed projects, four of them had African American residents. The intended purpose for these projects was to lower crime and death rates. Moreover, there was a conflict when the white population did not want the Black population to dwell near them. The ADA had several moral and legal conflicts to manage, as it had to undergo multiple legal loopholes to excise the alley dwellers out of their homes.

== Black demographic ==
The Black population in DC Alleys was at its zenith during the late nineteenth century, although they could not afford sufficient housing. The Black population needed more housing in order to live comfortably, but since they did not have more housing, living conditions were often cramped, particularly in small apartments. At the same time, it was necessary for them to live in DC and be close enough to their jobs. John Ihlder, a supporter of public housing and an executive officer for the ADA, dealt with implementing alley development. One government official whom Ihlder contacted was Dr. William T. Grady, chairman in office. The two exchanged letters in order to deal with St. Mary's court apartment which was specifically built for “negro occupancy". The white population believed that the Black population should be completely moved out of the DC district, and that St. Mary's court should be renewed and housed for the white people living in these areas. They began to have regulations on being able to live in these apartments, causing “negroes” to live on the outskirts of town. The regulations included working in the West End, and preferences toward families over single people. Ihlder stated that three to four years before June 25, 1939, African Americans occupied most of D.C.'s alley dwellings. Five to six thousand African Americans paid low rent housing with the alley dwellings. The whites wanted to and had nuked the Black residents' “negro occupancy”. The government stated that this was inaccurate, that the reasoning for the Blacks being moved out from these alleys was for them to improve the conditions of their living environment. Their plan was to add indoor plumbing and polish the housing and make more room, and made Blacks move into low income homes for 3–4 months. When the Blacks came back to purchase their homes, they found that they were unable to afford them due to the new improvements. Not all government officials were trying to push Blacks out of these alleys; one of the main advocates for Blacks staying in these alleys was Eleanor Roosevelt.

== Eleanor Roosevelt's involvement ==
Eleanor Roosevelt was a strong advocate for the Washington Housing Authority, as she looked to put an end to discrimination. As the president of the committee, Eleanor Roosevelt made it a priority for her to aid the alley dwellers. On June 12, 1934, the District of Columbia Alley Dwelling Act was passed, establishing the Washington Housing Authority as an independent agency. The government attempted to eliminate the alley dwelling lifestyle and tried to improve the situation which was the cause for the New Deal.

== ADA and Snows Court ==
The ADA had a significant effect upon the development of alleys, particularly in Foggy Bottom. An alley dwelling within Foggy Bottom, Snows Court, witnessed some of the most prevalent changes in terms of alley development. The ADA effectively mended the initially horrid living conditions and the problems that arose with overpopulation in Snows Court. Because of their actions, Snows Court today is affiliated primarily with the middle and the upper class.

== See also ==
- 1934 in the United States
- Gentrification in the United States
- Great Depression in the United States
- History of Washington, D.C.
- Housing in the United States
- Slum upgrading
- Urban renewal
