= Lewis Cary =

American silversmith (1798–1834)

- Born: March 31, 1798; Quincy, Massachusetts, U.S.
- Died: November 1834 (aged 36)
- Occupation: Silversmith
- Spouse: Adeline Billings (m. 1821)

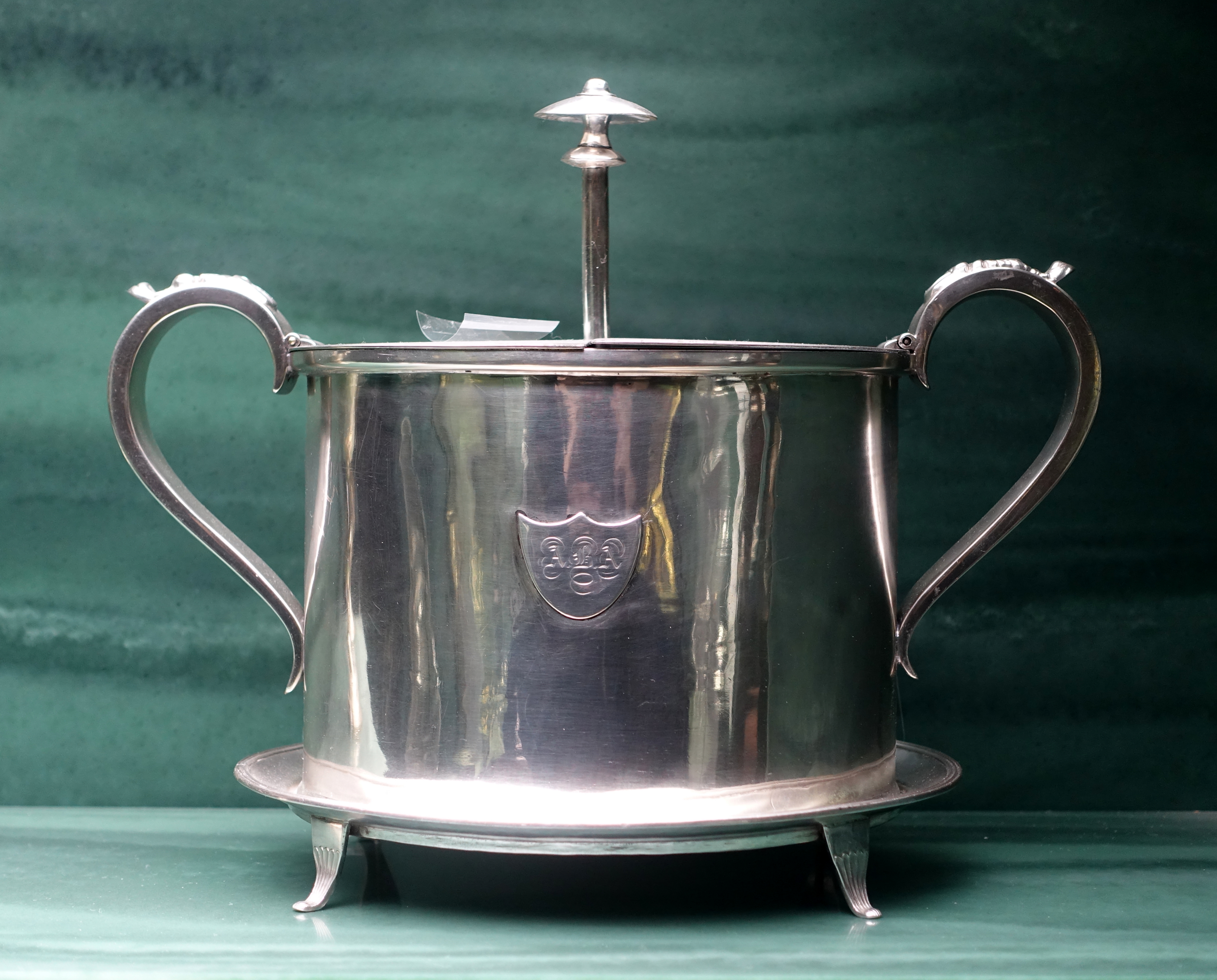
Egg warmer by Lewis Cary, made for Abigail Brooks Adams, c. 1819

Lewis Cary (March 31, 1798 – November 1834) was an American silversmith active in Boston.

Cary was born in Quincy, Massachusetts. He was apparently apprenticed circa 1811–1815 to Churchill & Treadwell in Boston and provided additional silver for Boston's West Church to supplement silver made by Churchill. It appears that Cary bought a silversmith business in 1820 from Hazen Morse (1790–1874), his brother-in-law, and worked from 1820 to 1832 as a silversmith, with his shop at 5 Piedmont Street. In 1821 he married Adeline Billings in Dorchester, Massachusetts. In 1828 he became a member of the Massachusetts Charitable Mechanic Association. Today Cary is remembered primarily for the silver he made for churches in Boston and as far away as Deerfield, Massachusetts. His work is collected in the Metropolitan Museum of Art, the Museum of Fine Arts Boston, and the Museum of Fine Arts, Houston.
