= Charlotte Wise =

Charlotte Wise may refer to:

- Charlotte Everett Hopkins (1851–1935, born Charlotte Wise), American philanthropist
- Charlotte Wise (writer), screenwriter of Remedy (film) (2005)
