= Democracy: An American Novel =

1880 novel by Henry Brooks Adams

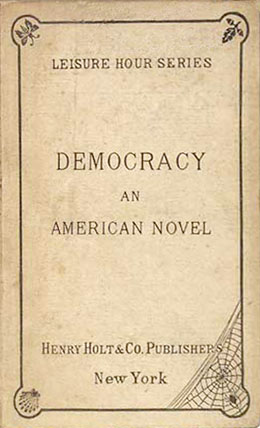
- First edition cover from 1880
- Author: Henry Adams
- Language: English
- Publisher: Henry Holt & Co.
- Publication date: 1880
- Publication place: United States
- Media type: Print

Democracy: An American Novel is a political novel written by Henry Brooks Adams and published anonymously in 1880. Only after the writer's death in 1918 did his publisher reveal Adams's authorship although, upon publication, the novel had immediately become popular. Contemporaneous conjecture placed the book under the joint authorship of Clarence King, John Hay and Henry Adams and their spouses who lived side by side on H street in Washington, D.C., and were collectively sometimes called "the Five of Hearts."

In January 2005, the Washington National Opera premiered Democracy: An American Comedy, an opera by Scott Wheeler and Romulus Linney based upon Henry Adams' book.

Democracy is a novel about political power, its acquisition, use and abuse. It is set at the beginning of a new administration, with the election campaign just over and the new President of the United States just having been elected. However, all the characters depicted are entirely fictitious. The new president's Christian name is Jacob, while his full name is never revealed. In a 1961 foreword to the novel, Henry D. Aiken states that the U.S. president of the novel "bears some resemblance to Andrew Johnson, to Garfield, and to Grant". Dates are never mentioned either, but internal evidence (at one point a 25-year-old woman says that she was "almost an infant" during the Civil War) suggests it is set in the late 1870s.

== Plot summary ==
Madeleine Lee, the daughter of an eminent clergyman, is a 30-year-old widow of independent means living in New York City. Five years ago she lost, in quick succession, her husband and her baby. She used to be "a rather fast New York girl" before her marriage but now is virtually unable to get over the great loss she has suffered.

Bored stiff by New York society, Madeleine Lee decides to go to Washington to be close to the hub of politics. Together with her sister Sybil Ross, she arrives in the capital, and in no time her salon becomes the meeting place of important people in the city. Although she has no intention of becoming romantically involved, two men eventually emerge from the group gathering around her, both of whom would very much like to marry her: John Carrington, who is truly and deeply in love with her; and Silas P. Ratcliffe, whose marriage to Madeleine Lee would help him advance his political career.

Over the months, Madeleine Lee gains insight into the machinations at the center of political life. Seeing his chances fade, Ratcliffe devises a sophisticated scheme to get rid of John Carrington: he secures a post abroad for his rival, who—as the job is rather well-paid and his family has little money—cannot but accept the offer. Ratcliffe manoeuvres Madeleine Lee into a difficult position in which he thinks the only choice left to her will be to marry him. Carrington, however, has left behind a sealed letter in which he accuses Ratcliffe of being corrupt. In particular, he accuses Ratcliffe of having taken graft during the election campaign eight years ago. All evidence, Carrington adds, has been destroyed, so it is his word against Ratcliffe's. Ratcliffe denies all allegations, but Madeleine Lee is so shocked at the revelation that she turns down Ratcliffe's proposal of marriage. Furious, Ratcliffe leaves Madeleine's house, only to be accosted and ridiculed by his arch-enemy Baron Jacobi, the Bulgarian minister. A brief scene of physical violence ensues between the two, and at the very last moment Ratcliffe, whose career would be ruined otherwise, is able to keep his wrath in check.

Disillusioned by politics, Madeleine Lee now wants to go abroad, preferably to Egypt. Sybil, who has become Carrington's confidante, writes him a letter in which she tells him he should try again to win her sister's heart once they have returned from their tour.

== Major themes ==
When, on December 1, Madeleine Lee boards the train that takes her from New York to the capital she wants to find "the mysterious gem which must lie hidden somewhere in politics". However, what she encounters both in her parlour and elsewhere is an ill-assorted group of men corrupted by greed, money and power; protégés and office-seekers; and, generally, people who, for various reasons, are wholly unsuited for any political office.

Her suitor, 50-year-old Silas P. Ratcliffe, is a case in point. A former governor of Illinois, he now serves as Senator from that state but is toying with the idea of running for president in four years' time. A widower, he thinks it may be helpful to have a loving and caring wife at his side and focuses his attention on Madeleine Lee. He views politics from its practical side only: Frankly admitting that, for him, the pleasure of politics lies in the possession of power, he categorically denies the existence of anything remotely resembling political philosophy.

Ratcliffe is presented as a "practical man" with very little general knowledge or learning. He may "know" his political business, but that seems to be worlds apart from academic knowledge or the ability to reason theoretically. Reflecting upon his career and his ambitions for the future, Ratcliffe admits that he goes to church mainly because he needs the churchgoers' votes. Once in church, however, his mind regularly wanders off, and he thinks about politics only.

Yet Ratcliffe is proud of himself and his achievements: as a lobbyist, he has often been able in the past to bring together hostile interests and to combine them to (almost) everyone's advantage. Accepting the good as well as the evil things in life, he rephrases the old (but wrong) dictum that the end justifies the means by stating that "if virtue won't answer our purpose, we must use vice, or our opponents will put us out of office." When Mrs. Lee asks him, "Are we for ever to be at the mercy of thieves and ruffians? Is a respectable government impossible in a democracy?", Ratcliffe's reply is as pragmatic as it is simple: "No representative government can long be much better or much worse than the society it represents. Purify society and you purify government."

In Democracy, the newly elected President of the United States is depicted as the epitome of provincialism, incompetence and corruption. Aged 60, he is an ex-governor, but basically "a plain Indiana farmer", one of "nature's noblemen". One of his nicknames is "Old Granite" and, just because it sounds similar, "Old Granny". Already at the first evening reception they give at the White House, the president and his wife are ridiculed as "automata", as wooden puppets, and as "aping royalty". The president's wife is at least as bad and unsuitable for the job as First Lady as her husband is for that of president, the only driving forces behind her actions being envy, jealousy, and the will to exercise and demonstrate her newly found power.

On March 4, the inauguration of the new president takes place. The president's plan concerning his arch-enemy (although of the same party) Ratcliffe is that he "must be made to come into a Cabinet where every other voice would be against him." But very soon, it turns out that the president's plan has backfired and that he is becoming increasingly dependent on Ratcliffe, who is even commissioned to write the president's Inaugural address. One of the programmatic promises of the new president during the election campaign was that there would be no "wholesale removals from office". But this is exactly what happens: All the President's friends are "stuffed in somewhere", whereas the few able and competent "office-seekers" do not get jobs in the new administration.

A considerable part of the novel is dedicated to the discussion of topical political issues, including universal suffrage ("Democracy asserts the fact that the masses are now raised to higher intelligence than formerly"), communism, Darwinism and, generally, whether the future is something one should be looking forward to. As Mrs. Lee puts it, "Half of our wise men declare that the world is going straight to perdition; the other half that it is fast becoming perfect. Both cannot be right. [...] I must know whether America is right or wrong."

Opposed to reform in general, Ratcliffe does not have any faith in the "new dogmas" such as science or the theory of evolution, succumbing to the common misconception that what it is all about is that man "descended from monkeys". He emphasizes man's "divine nature" (rather than his human nature) where there is no place for survival of the fittest, while at the same time arguing like one of "nature's true noblemen", a kind of noble savage indigenous to North America. As one such specimen, he brings every discussion down to his level.

Mrs. Lee refuses his proposal in the end and she goes to Egypt to get away from the corrupt world.

== Quotes ==
- "Any woman will, under the right conditions, marry any man at any time, provided her 'higher nature' is properly appealed to."
- "Men are creatures made for women to dispose of."
- "... no representative government can long be much better or much worse than the society it represents. Purify society and you purify the government. But try to purify the government artificially and you only aggravate failure."

== See also ==
- Politics in fiction
