= Peter Chardon Brooks =

Massachusetts merchant, slave-trade insurer, and politician (1767-1849)

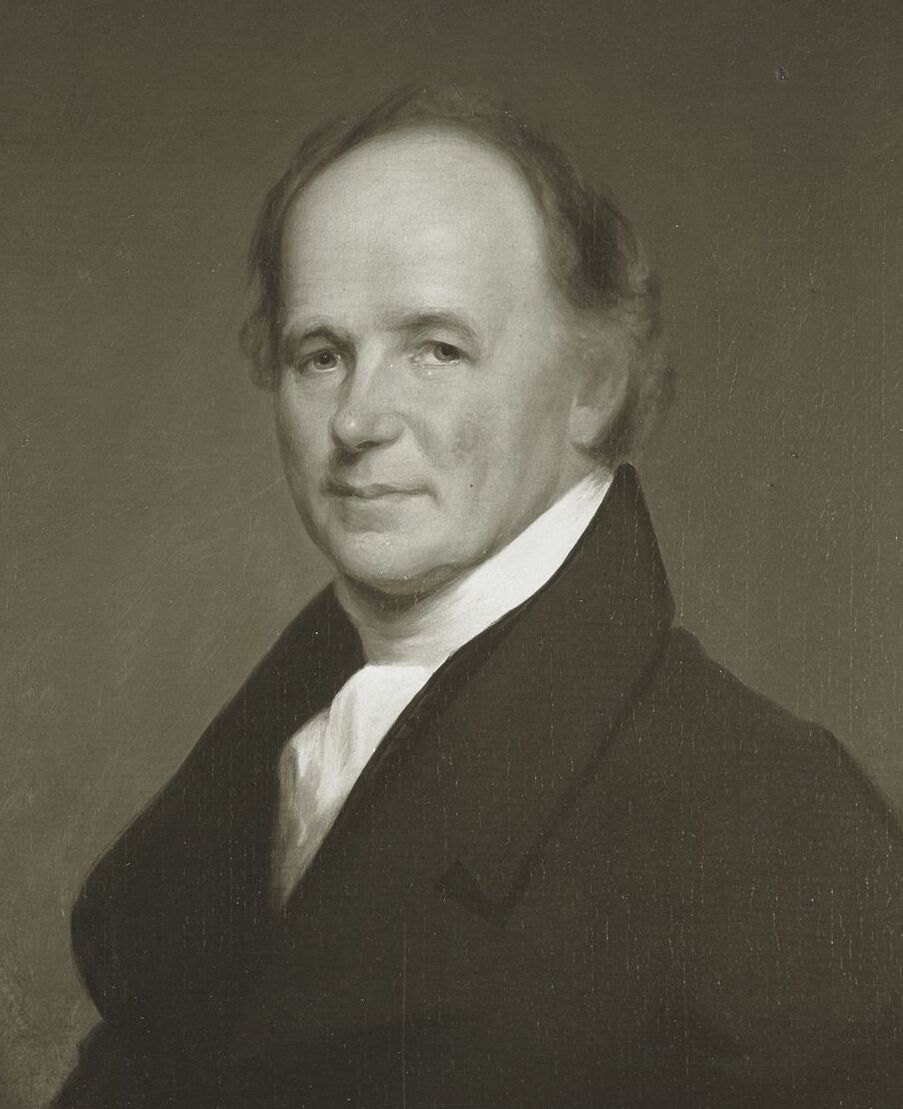
- Born: January 6, 1767; North Yarmouth, Massachusetts Bay
- Died: January 1, 1849 (aged 81); Boston, Massachusetts
- Occupations: Insurance businessman, state senator
- Employer: New England Marine Insurance Company
- Spouse: Ann Gorham (m. 1792; died 1830)
- Children: 13
- Parent(s): Edward Brooks; Abigail Brown
- Relatives: Peter Brooks Adams (grandson); Henry Adams (grandson)

Peter Chardon Brooks (January 6, 1767 – January 1, 1849) was a wealthy Massachusetts merchant and politician. He was said to be the richest man in New England at his death. A major part of his wealth derived from insuring the vessels engaged in the slave trade.

== Early life ==
Brooks was born in North Yarmouth, Massachusetts Bay, on January 6, 1767. His parents were the Rev. Edward Brooks and Abigail Brown. In 1769, the family moved to Medford, Massachusetts, his father's native town, where Brooks' boyhood was spent working on the family farm.

In 1781, after his father's death, the 14-year-old Brooks was apprenticed to a trade in Boston. He walked to the city, a distance of seven miles, every day.

== Career ==
In 1789, Brooks engaged in the business of marine insurance, often for ships involved in the kidnapping and sale of African people through the trans-Atlantic slave trade, and accumulated a large fortune. He kept with his own hand very accurate accounts, a rare thing in those days, and made it a rule never to borrow money, never to engage in speculation of any kind, and never to take more than the legal rate of interest. He retired from business in 1803, and, until 1806, devoted himself to the settlement of all the risks in which he was interested.

He then accepted the presidency of the New England Insurance Company, the first chartered company of the kind in the state, and filled the office for several years. In his retirement at Medford he took special pleasure in the cultivation of trees, planting many thousands of them about his farm. He was at different times a member of both branches of the legislature, of the first Boston City Council, and of the Massachusetts Constitutional Convention of 1820–1821.

While in the legislature, he took a prominent part in suppressing lotteries, which at that time were flourishing in the state. Mr. Brooks gave liberally, and without parade, to many benevolent objects, and, besides this, his private donations for many years exceeded his domestic expenses.

== Personal life ==
On November 26, 1792, Brooks was married to Ann Gorham (1771–1830), a daughter of Nathaniel Gorham (1738–1796), the 14th President of the Continental Congress, and sister of Benjamin Gorham, a U.S. Representative from Massachusetts. They were the parents of 13 children, of which the following survived to adulthood:

- Edward Brooks (1793–1878), who married Eliza Root
- Gorham Brooks (1795–1855), who married Ellen Sheppard in April 1829.
- Ann Gorham Brooks (1797–1864), who married Nathaniel Langdon Frothingham (1798–1870) on March 2, 1818.
- Peter Chardon Brooks Jr. (1798–1880), who married Susan Oliver Heard (1806–1884) on November 9, 1825.
- Sidney Brooks (1799–1878), who married Frances Dehon (1805–1871) on December 27, 1827.
- Charlotte Gray Brooks (1800–1859), who married Edward Everett (1794–1865) on May 8, 1822.
- Ward Chipman Brooks (1804–1828)
- Henry Brooks (1807–1833)
- Abigail Brown Brooks (1808–1889), who married Charles Francis Adams Sr. (1807–1886), on September 3, 1829.

Brooks died January 1, 1849, in Boston, Massachusetts, bequeathing what was believed to be the largest estate in Boston, about two million dollars, to his seven surviving children. He was originally buried at the Salem Street Burying Ground in Medford, Massachusetts, but was later relocated to a family plot in Oak Grove Cemetery, near the Brooks Estate in Medford.

=== Descendants ===
Brooks was a grandfather of historians Peter Chardon Brooks Adams and Henry Brooks Adams great-grandfather of Washington philanthropist Charlotte Everett Hopkins, and great-great-grandfather of Massachusetts governor and senator Leverett Saltonstall. Brooks' fourth great-grandson, Dr. Patrick Graves Jackson, is the husband of Supreme Court Justice Ketanji Brown-Jackson.

=== Legacy ===
- He is considered to have been one of the 100 wealthiest Americans, having left an enormous fortune.
- The town of Chardon, Ohio is named for him.
