= Henry Augustus Wise =

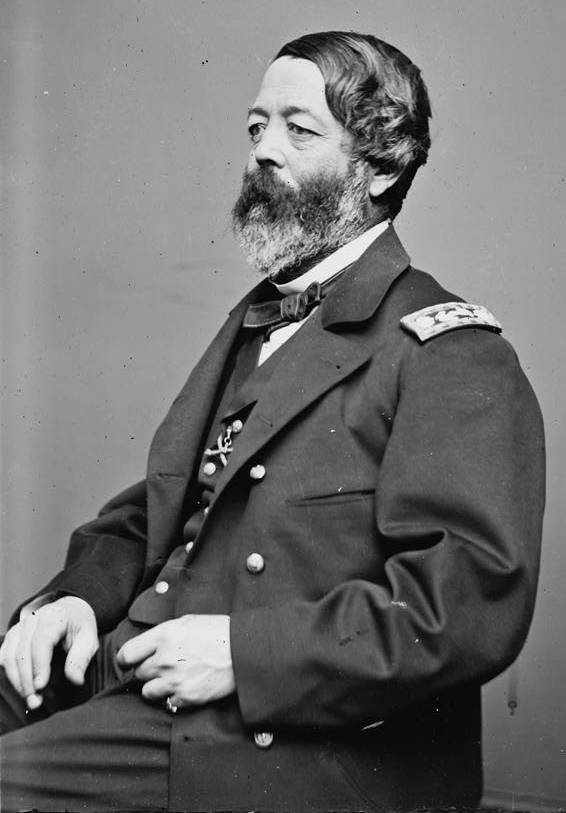
Henry Augustus Wise in naval uniform

Henry Augustus Wise (May 24, 1819 – April 3, 1869) was an American author and United States Navy officer.

== Biography ==
He was born in Brooklyn, New York, to George Stewart Wise and Catherine Standsberry. The Wise family moved to Virginia and his Naval career began in 1834 as a midshipman. Henry served in the Mexican-American War as a lieutenant on board the razee Independence, seeing action in the Gulf of California. He dedicated his consequent naval service in becoming an expert in gunnery. When the American Civil War broke out he considered serving with his home state of Virginia when they left the Union but opted to stay in the U.S. Navy as a captain. Promoted to commander of the USS Niagara in 1862, he was soon ordered to destroy the Gosport Navy Yard, near his old home. In 1864 President Abraham Lincoln appointed Wise chief of the Bureau of Ordnance, and he was promoted to captain in 1866; he held the ordnance position until his resignation in 1868. He died in Naples, Italy, the following year. In 1850 he married Catherine Brooks Everett, daughter of Edward Everett and Charlotte Gray Brooks.

== Family ==
1. Charlotte Everett Wise (1851–1935) married Archibald Hopkins
2. Katherine Wise (1852–1920) married Jacob W. Miller
3. Edward Everett Wise (1854–1891) married Marion McAllister
4. Henrietta Augusta Wise (1860–1920) married (1) Lt. John Downes (2) W.K. Nicholsen

== Principal works ==
Under the pen name of "Harry Gringo"

- Los Gringos, or an Interior View of Mexico and California, with Wanderings in Peru, Chile, and Polynesia, 1849. (Used as the basis for the 1906 opera The Sacrifice, Op. 27, by Frederick Converse)
- Tales for the Marines, 1855
- Scampavias: From Gibel-Tarek to Stamboul, 1857
- The Story of the Gray African Parrot, 1859
- Captain Brand of the Schooner Centipede, 1860–64
