= Esther (novel) =

Novel by Henry Adams

- Author: Henry Adams
- Language: English
- Publisher: H. Holt and Company
- Publication date: 1884
- LC Class: PS1004.A4 E8

Esther is a novel by Henry Adams first published in 1884 under the pen name "Frances Snow Compton".

The book was republished in 1938, with an introduction by Robert E. Spiller.

== Plot introduction ==
The comic story deals with a young, freethinking socialite who falls desperately in love with an Episcopal minister. The result is a clash of intellects, a confrontation between faith and reason and a battle of the sexes.
