= The Education of Henry Adams =

1907 autobiography by Henry Brooks Adams

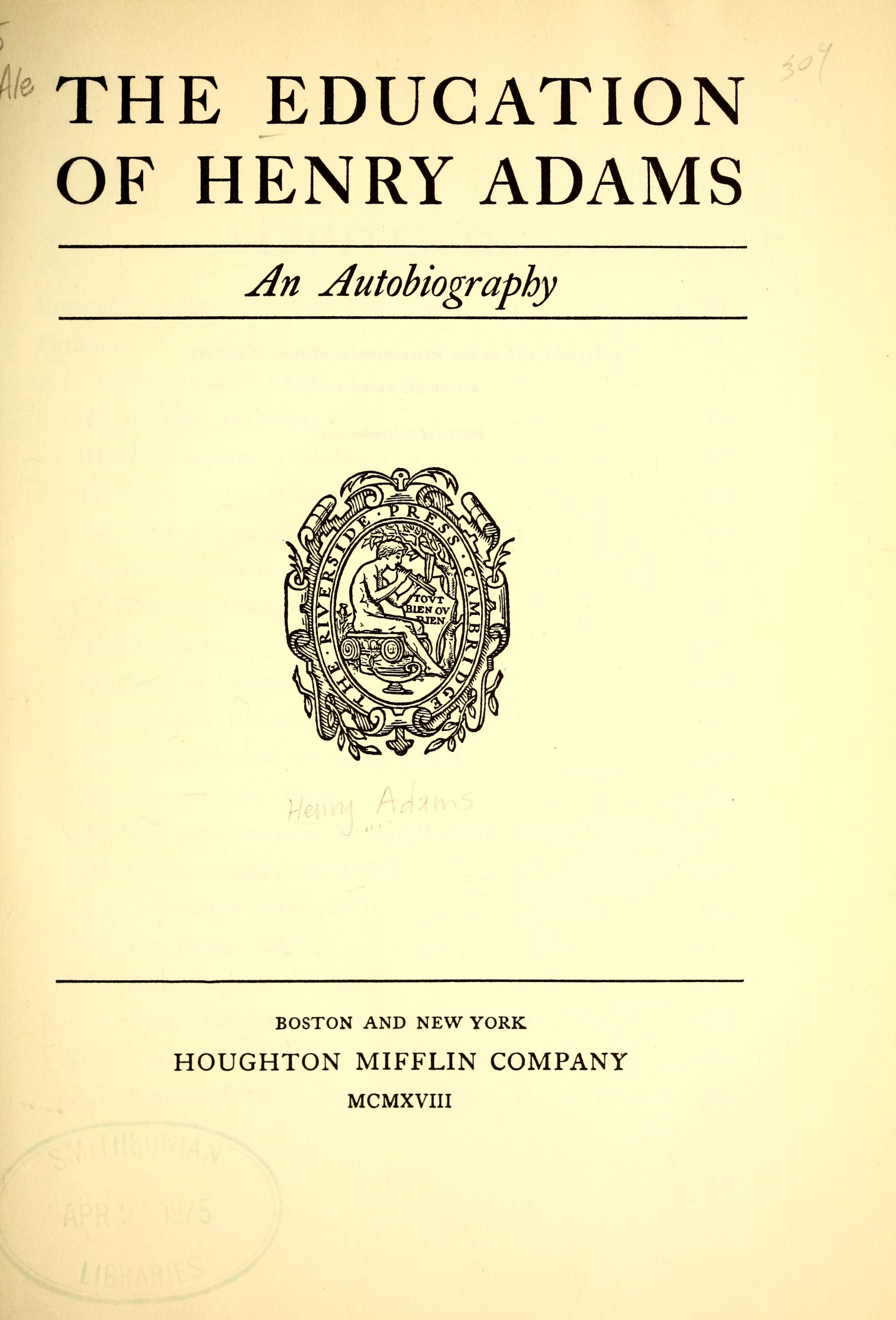
- Author: Henry Adams
- Genre: autobiography
- Publisher: Houghton Mifflin
- Awards: Pulitzer Prize for Biography or Autobiography
- Text: The Education of Henry Adams at Wikisource

The Education of Henry Adams is an autobiography that records the struggle of the Bostonian Henry Adams (1838–1918), in his later years, to come to terms with the dawning 20th century, so different from the world of his youth. It is also a sharp critique of 19th-century educational theory and practice. In 1907, Adams began privately circulating copies of a limited edition printed at his own expense. Commercial publication of the book had to await its author's 1918 death, whereupon it won the 1919 Pulitzer Prize. The Modern Library placed it first in a list of the top 100 English-language nonfiction books of the 20th century.

== Subject ==
The Education is more a record of Adams's introspection and his observations than of his deeds. It is an extended meditation on the social, technological, political, and intellectual changes that occurred over Adams's lifetime. Adams concluded that his traditional education failed to help him come to terms with these rapid changes, hence, his need for self-education. The organizing thread of the book is how the "proper" schooling and other aspects of his youth was time wasted, thus, his search for self-education through experiences, friendships, and reading.

Many aspects of the contemporary world emerged during the half-century between the Civil War and World War I, a half-century coinciding with Adams's adult life. An important theme of The Education is its author's bewilderment and concern at the rapid advance in science and technology over the course of his lifetime, sometimes now called Second Industrial Revolution, but incarnated in his term "dynamo". The Education mentions the recent discovery of X-rays and radioactivity, and shows a familiarity with radio waves in his citation of Marconi and Branly. Adams purchased an automobile as early as 1902, to make better use of a summer in France researching Mont Saint Michel and Chartres. He correctly predicted that the 20th century would have even more explosive changes. Adams repeatedly laments that his formal education, grounded in the classics, history, and literature, as was then the fashion, did not give him the scientific and mathematical knowledge needed to grasp the scientific breakthroughs of the 1890s and 1900s.

Adams had direct knowledge of many notable events and persons of the 1850–1900 period, and much of the text is devoted to giving his views on them. The text is written as if readers are already familiar with the major figures and events of the time. The Education repeatedly mentions two long-standing friends of Adams, the scientific explorer of the American Far West, Clarence King, and the American diplomat, John Milton Hay, who became Secretary of State. The Education is narrated in the third person. It is frequently sarcastic and humorously self-critical.

The Education does not discuss Adams's marriage, and the illness and 1885 suicide of his wife, Clover; it mostly leaves out the periods from 1872 to 1892. The text does not discuss what this period contributed to his education. He referred to his marriage indirectly, by for example, lamenting how the memorial he had constructed for his wife had become something of a tourist attraction.

== Context ==
Henry Adams' life story is rooted in the American political aristocracy that emerged from the American Revolution. He was the grandson of the American President John Quincy Adams and great-grandson of President and founding father John Adams. His father, Charles Francis Adams, had served as ambassador to the United Kingdom during the Civil War, and had been elected to the United States House of Representatives. His brothers Brooks Adams and Charles Francis Adams Jr. were also historians of note. Henry Adams had received the finest formal education available in the United States, enjoying many other advantages, as well. This social context makes The Education so important, but the trappings of success did not mean much to a restless individualist such as Adams. Rather than take advantage of his patrician name, he sized up this and other advantages and found them wanting.

== Assessment ==
The Education is an important work of American literary nonfiction. It provides a penetrating glimpse into the intellectual and political life of the late 19th century. The Modern Library placed it first in a list of the top 100 English-language nonfiction books of the 20th century.

Author and historian Garry Wills has suggested The Education contradicts much of Adams' earlier work and opinions, and has biased assessments of Adams' earlier historical works.

== In popular culture ==
In his novel V., Thomas Pynchon likens his protagonist Herbert Stencil to Henry Adams in the Education, as they both refer to themselves in the third person.

The lyrics of "Long Folk Revival" by Thirsty Curses include a line "...it's The New Education of Henry Adams".

In the film Footlight Parade (1933) the character of Chester Kent (James Cagney) visits his secretary Nan (Joan Blondell) in her apartment. Nan has her friend Vivian (Claire Dodd) visiting from Hollywood. Vivian is reading a copy of The Education of Henry Adams.
