= Henry Hopkins (pastor) =

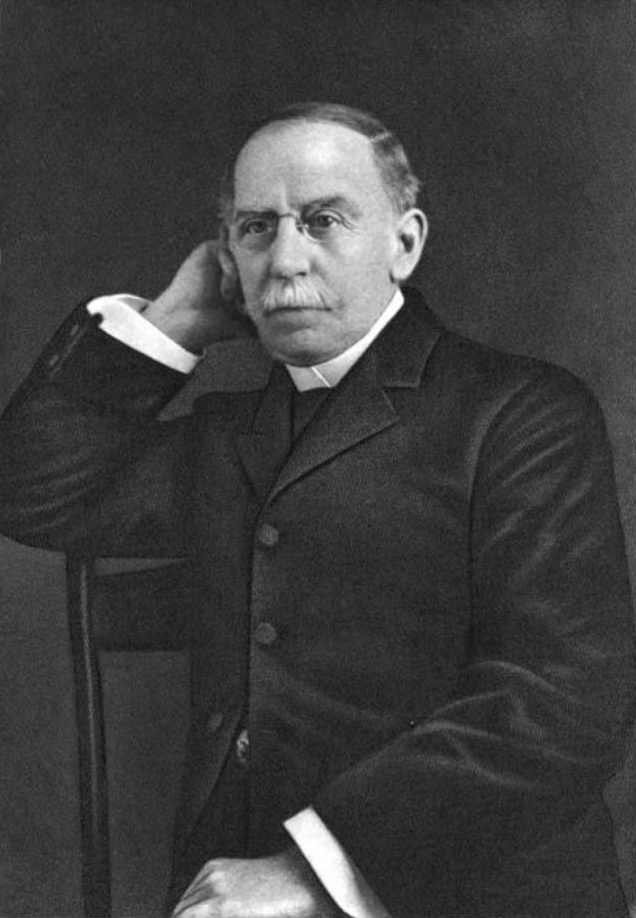
- Born: November 30, 1837; Williamstown, Massachusetts, U.S.
- Died: August 18, 1908 (aged 70); Rotterdam, Netherlands
- Education: Williams College
- Occupations: Clergyman, educator
- Father: Mark Hopkins

Signature
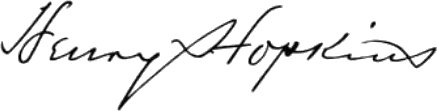

Henry Hopkins (November 30, 1837 – August 18, 1908) was an American Congregationalist pastor and president of Williams College.

== Life and career ==
Henry Hopkins was born in Williamstown, Massachusetts on November 30, 1837, the son of Mark Hopkins. He grew up in Williamstown and graduated from Williams College in 1858, where he was a member of Kappa Alpha Society. He studied theology at Union Seminary and was ordained as a minister in 1861.

Hopkins became president of Williams in 1902, following the service of acting president John Haskell Hewitt, and served until his planned retirement in 1908. He died of pneumonia on August 18, 1908, shortly after retiring while traveling in Rotterdam.
