= Abigail Brooks Adams =

Wife of Charles F. Adams Sr.

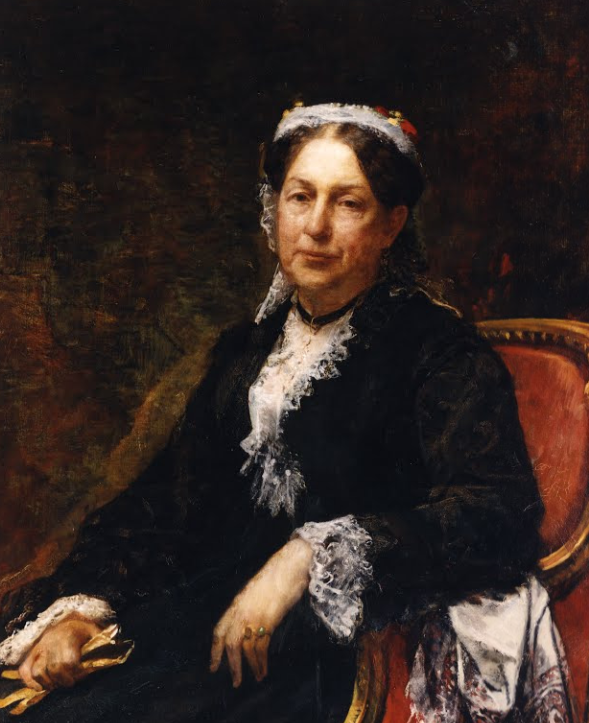
- Portrait of Abigail Brooks Adams painted by William Morris Hunt in 1872
- Born: Abigail Brown Brooks; April 25, 1808; Medford, Massachusetts, U.S.
- Died: June 6, 1889 (aged 81); Quincy, Massachusetts, U.S.
- Spouse: Charles Francis Adams Sr. (m. 1829; died 1886)
- Children: 7, including John, Charles Jr., Henry, and Brooks
- Father: Peter Chardon Brooks
- Relatives: Adams political family

Abigail Brown Adams (née Brooks; April 25, 1808 – June 6, 1889) was a member of the Adams political family and the wife of Charles Francis Adams Sr. She was a daughter of Peter Chardon Brooks and Ann Gorham.

== Biography ==
Abigail was born on April 25, 1808, in Medford, Massachusetts. She was the youngest of three daughters from Peter Chardon Brooks and Ann Gorham. In early 1827, 19-year-old Abigail met Charles Francis Adams Sr. of the Adams political family. Her father was hesitant to accept the relationship.

On September 3, 1829, Abigail married Charles and moved into a new house at Hancock Avenue, Boston. Abigail at one point served as the County Manager for the Mount Vernon Ladies' Association in 1858.

== Death ==
Abigail's health was slowly declining due to poor health care along with Charles. The couple remained married until Charles' death in 1886. Abigail died on June 6, 1889, in Quincy, Massachusetts at age 81.

They were the parents of seven, including John Quincy Adams II, Charles Francis Adams Jr., and Henry Brooks Adams.
