= Henry Adams =

American historian (1838–1918)

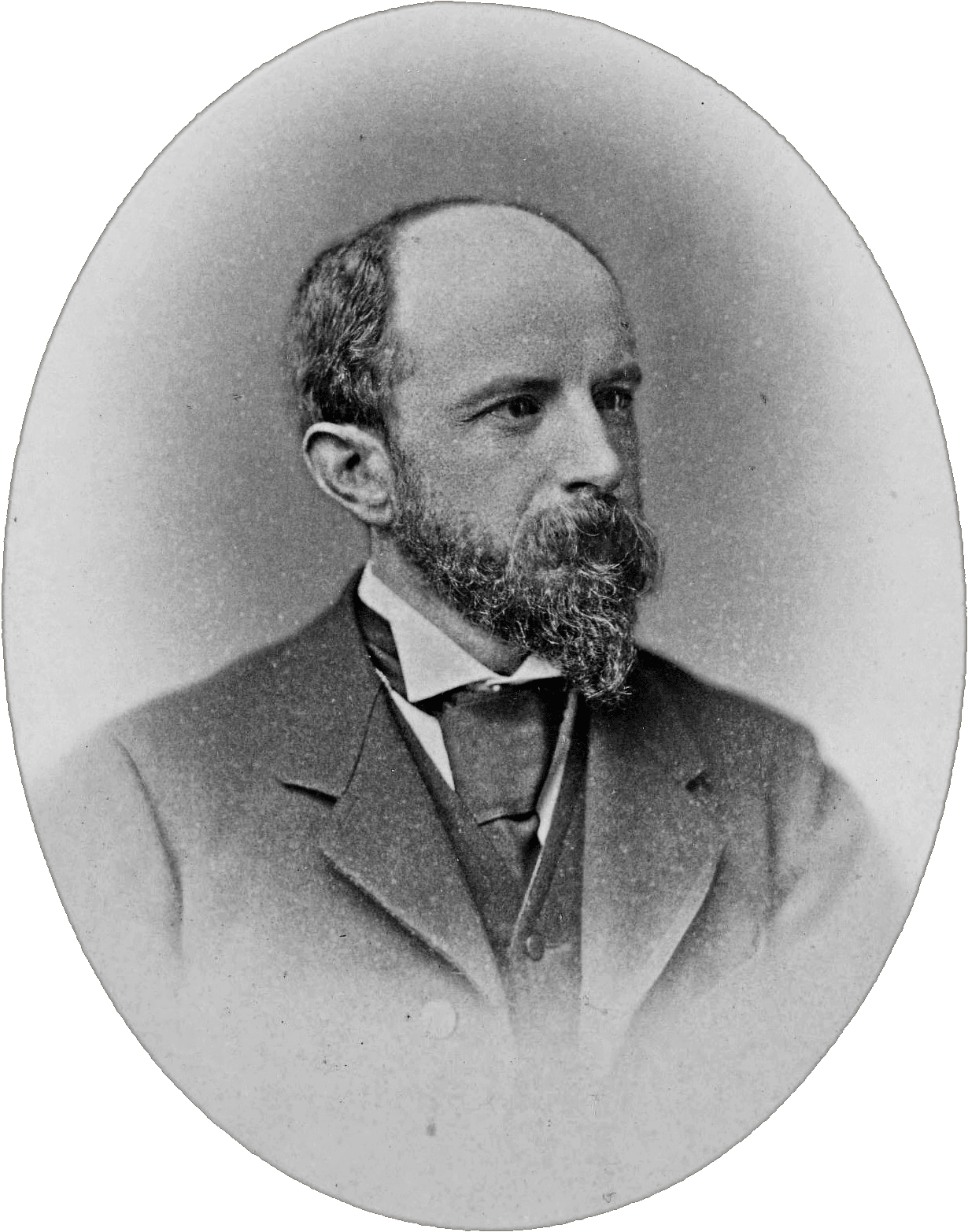
- 1885 photograph of Adams by William Notman
- Born: Henry Brooks Adams; February 16, 1838; Boston, Massachusetts, U.S.
- Died: March 27, 1918 (aged 80); Washington, D.C., U.S.
- Resting place: Rock Creek Cemetery; Washington, D.C., U.S.
- Education: Harvard College; University of Berlin
- Occupations: Journalist; historian; academic; novelist
- Spouse: Marian Hooper Adams
- Relatives: Charles Francis Adams Sr. (father); Abigail Brown Brooks (mother)
- Writing career
- Pen name: Frances Snow Compton
- Language: English
- Genres: memoir, history
- Notable works: The Education of Henry Adams, The History of the United States of America 1801–1817
- Notable awards: Pulitzer Prize

Henry Brooks Adams (February 16, 1838 – March 27, 1918) was an American historian, journalist, author, intellectual, and prominent figure in high society in London and Washington, D.C. He was a member of the Adams political family, descended from two U.S. presidents. His views on matters of public concern were influential on the leading figures of his day, including John Hay, Theodore Roosevelt, and Henry Cabot Lodge, and his work has had enduring influence on the historiography of the United States and the academic discipline of history in the United States.

As a young Harvard graduate, he served as secretary to his father, Charles Francis Adams, Abraham Lincoln's minister to the United Kingdom. The posting influenced the younger man through the experience of wartime diplomacy and absorption in English culture, especially the works of John Stuart Mill. After the American Civil War, he became a political journalist who entertained America's foremost intellectuals at his homes in Washington and Boston.

During his lifetime, he was best known for The History of the United States of America 1801–1817, a nine-volume work, praised for its literary style, command of the documentary evidence, and deep knowledge of the period and its major figures. His memoir, The Education of Henry Adams, was published posthumously. It won the Pulitzer Prize and was named the best English-language nonfiction book of the 20th century by the Modern Library.

== Biography ==
=== Early life and education ===
Henry Brooks Adams was born in Boston on February 16, 1838 to Charles Francis Adams Sr. (1807–1886) and Abigail Brown Adams (1808–1889). Both his paternal grandfather, John Quincy Adams, and great-grandfather, John Adams, had been presidents of the United States, and his maternal grandfather, Peter Chardon Brooks, was one of the most successful merchants in Boston. He was the fourth of five children: Louisa Catherine (1831–70), John Quincy II (1833–94), Charles Jr. (1835–1915), and Brooks (1848–1927).

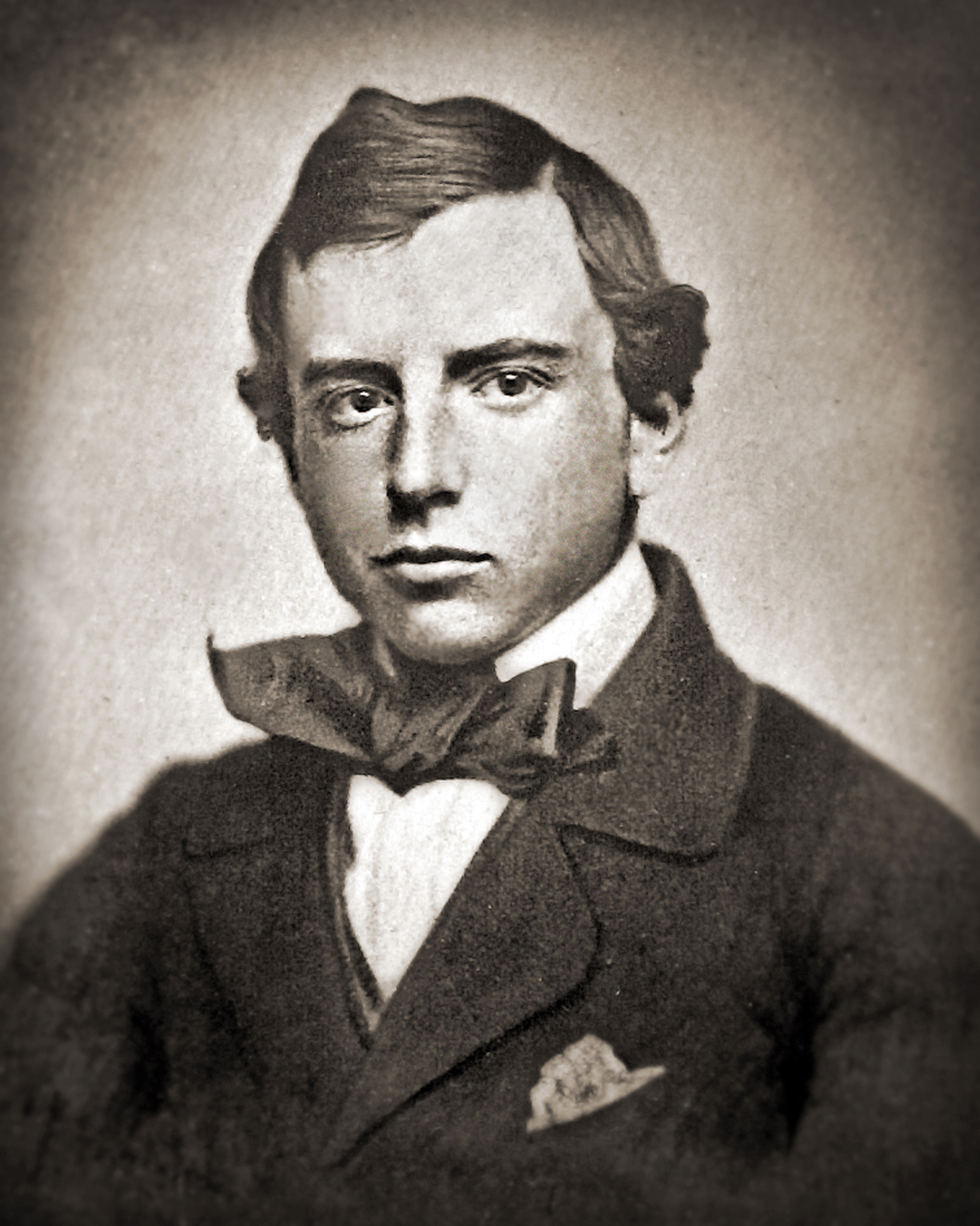
Harvard graduation photo: 1858

Adams was among the first students at the Dixwell School. He graduated from Harvard College in 1858, after which he embarked on a grand tour of Europe, during which he attended lectures in civil law at the University of Berlin.

At the 1893 Columbian Exposition, Adams was initiated as an honorary member of Phi Kappa Psi by Harris J. Ryan. Through that organization, he was also a member of the Irving Literary Society.

=== London (1861–1868) ===
Adams returned home from Europe in the midst of the heated 1860 presidential election. He tried his hand at reading law, taking short-lived employment with Horace Gray in the firm known today as Ropes & Gray. His father won re-election to the United States House of Representatives, and Henry joined him in Washington as his private secretary. Henry shouldered the responsibility reluctantly and with much self-doubt. "[I] had little to do", he reflected later, "and knew not how to do it rightly."

While in Washington, Adams worked anonymously as the Washington correspondent for Charles Hale's Boston Daily Advertiser.

On March 19, 1861, Abraham Lincoln appointed Charles Sr. as minister to the United Kingdom. Henry accompanied his father to London, where he also became the anonymous London correspondent for The New York Times. For the next four years, Charles Sr. was kept very busy by the necessity of maintaining British neutrality in the American Civil War, monitoring Confederate intrigues, and obstructing the construction of Confederate commerce raiders and blockade runners in British shipyards. Henry's writings for the Times argued that Americans should be patient with the British.

While living in London, Adams befriended many noted men, including Charles Lyell, Francis Turner Palgrave, Richard Monckton Milnes, James Milnes Gaskell, and Charles Milnes Gaskell. He helped introduce the young Henry James to English society with the help of Charles Milnes Gaskell and his wife Catherine. During this period, Adams was influenced by the works of John Stuart Mill, especially the 1861 book Considerations on Representative Government, which Adams believed showed the necessity of an enlightened elite to lead elected governments, which were susceptible to demagoguery, ignorance, and corruption. Henry wrote that Mill's writing showed, "[D]emocracy is still capable of rewarding a conscientious servant."

=== Washington (1868–70) ===
In 1868, Adams returned to the United States and settled in Washington, where he continued working as a journalist, seeking to expose political corruption and advance a vision of democratic idealism based on the values of the 17th and 18th centuries. As a result, Adams was an early critic of the excesses which would come to define the politics of the Gilded Age.

=== Harvard professor (1870–77) ===
In 1870, Adams was appointed professor of medieval history at Harvard College. He held this position until his early retirement in 1877. As an academic historian, Adams is considered to have been the first (in 1874–1876) to conduct historical seminar work in the United States. His students included Henry Cabot Lodge, who also worked closely with Adams as a graduate student.

Adams was elected a Fellow of the American Academy of Arts and Sciences in 1875. In 1892, he received the honorary degree LL.D., from Western Reserve University.

=== Marriage to Marian Hooper (1872–85) ===
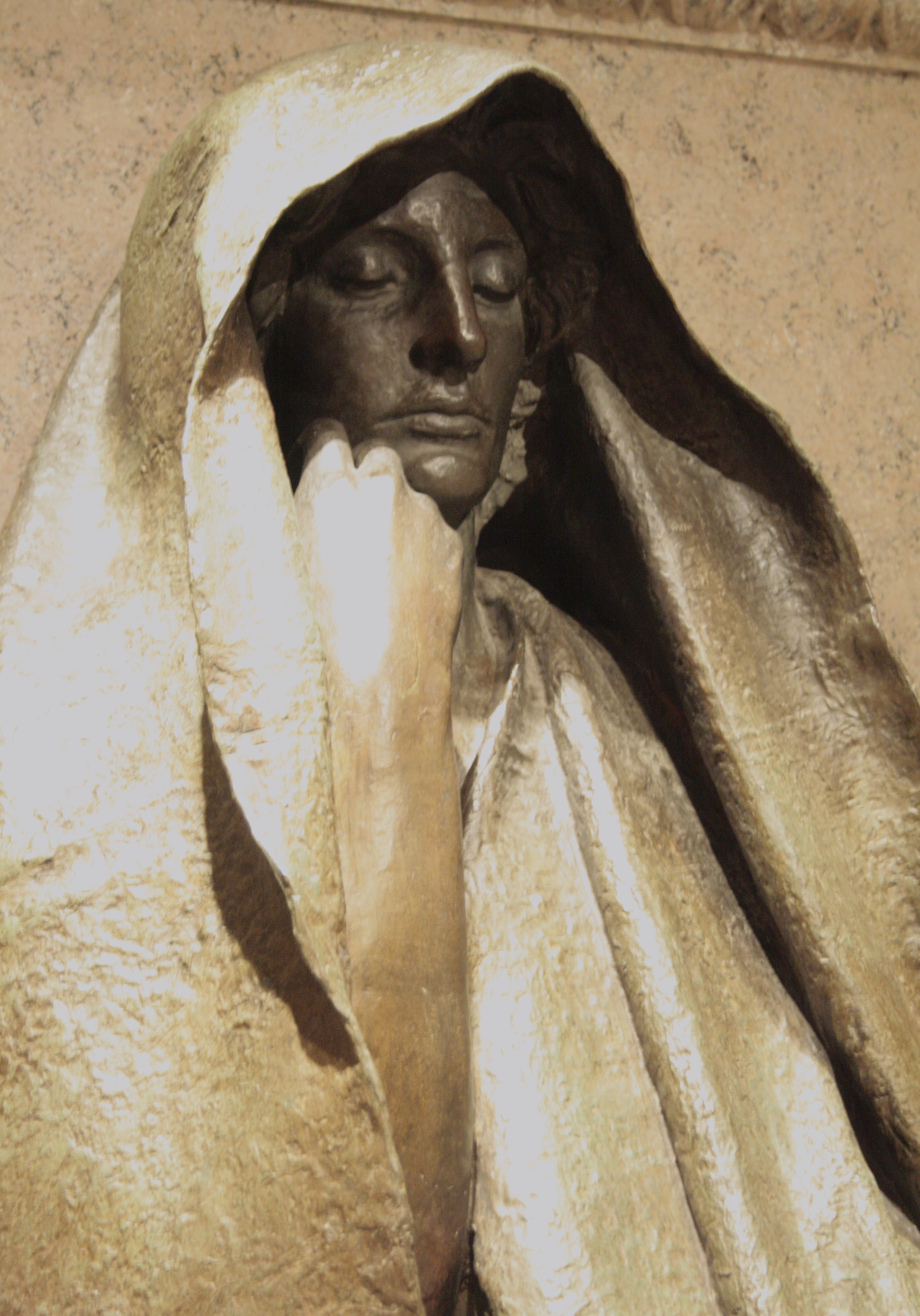
Adams Memorial by Augustus Saint-Gaudens

On June 27, 1872, Adams married Marian Hooper, better known to friends as Clover, in Beverly, Massachusetts. They honeymooned in Europe, much of it with Charles Milnes Gaskell at Wenlock Abbey, Shropshire. While there, exemplifying the New England civic conscience she and Henry shared, Clover wrote, "England is charming for a few families but hopeless for most ... Thank the Lord that the American eagle flaps and screams over us." Upon their return, Adams went back to his position at Harvard, and their home at 91 Marlborough Street in Boston became a gathering place for a lively intellectual circle. In 1877, the couple moved to Washington, D.C., where their home at 1607 H Street, across from the White House on Lafayette Square, became a center of social life in the capital city.

The couple had no children. They referred to themselves, along with John and Clara Hay and geologist and mountaineer Clarence King, as the "Five of Hearts."

==== Her suicide ====
On the morning of December 6, 1885, after a late Sunday breakfast, Clover went to her room. Henry left to see his dentist regarding a toothache, but while departing the home, he was met by a woman visiting for his wife. Adams went upstairs to ask if she would receive the visitor and found his wife lying on a rug before the fire, an opened vial of potassium cyanide, which Clover had frequently used in processing photographs, lay nearby. Adams carried his wife to a sofa and ran for a doctor. Shortly thereafter, she was pronounced dead.

A brief funeral service was held on December 9 at the Lafayette Square house. Only Henry, Charles Adams Jr., her siblings Edward and Ellen Hooper, and Ellen's husband Ephraim Gurney attended. Interment services followed at Rock Creek Cemetery, but the burial was postponed until December 11 because of inclement weather. A few weeks later, Adams ordered a modest headstone as a temporary marker. He later commissioned a monument for her tomb from Augustus Saint-Gaudens, who created a widely praised masterpiece, the untitled Adams Memorial, which marks the grave.

Much speculation and numerous theories have been given concerning the causes of Clover Adams's suicide. Her death has been attributed to depression over her father's death and a family history of depression and suicide. Posthumous speculation was made more difficult by Adams's destruction of most of Clover's letters and photos following her death. His memoir is profoundly silent about his wife after her suicide.

=== Relationship with Elizabeth Sherman Cameron ===
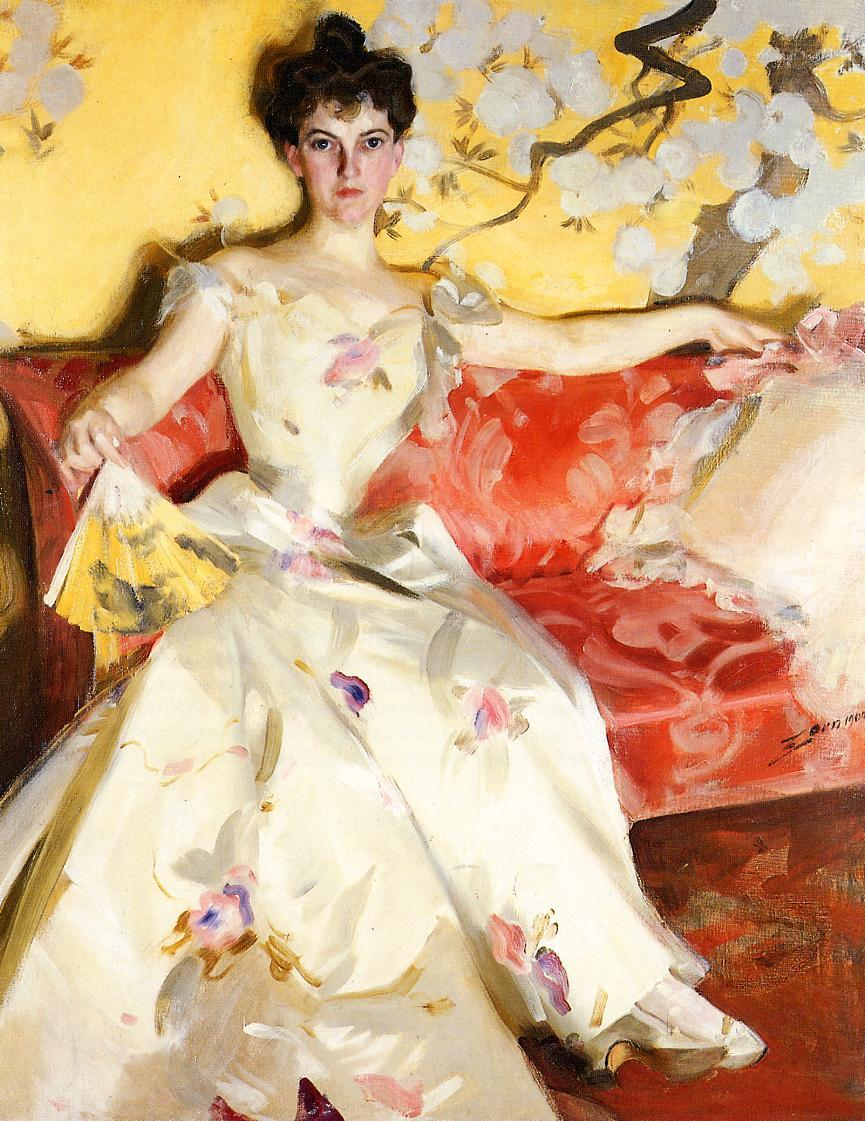
Portrait of Elizabeth Sherman Cameron (1900) by Anders Zorn

In January 1881, Adams met Elizabeth Sherman Cameron. She was the niece of Treasury secretary John Sherman and general William Tecumseh Sherman and considered one of the most beautiful and intelligent women in Washington. She had married Pennsylvania senator J. Donald Cameron, twenty-four years her senior, in 1878 in an arranged marriage which included a prenuptial agreement that provided her income from $160,000 worth of securities (approximately $5,004,000 in 2025). Cameron's six children from a previous marriage never accepted their young stepmother, and the marriage was further strained by Cameron's coarse indifference toward his young wife, his fondness for bourbon, and his reputation for political corruption, which Adams's satirized in his novel Democracy.

On May 19, 1883, Adams initiated a correspondence with Mrs. Cameron, when she and her husband departed for Europe. That letter reflected his unhappiness with her departure and his longing for her return. Adams sent Cameron hundreds of letters over the remainder of his life, recording a passionate yet unconsummated relationship. On December 7, 1884, one year before his wife's suicide, Adams wrote, "I shall dedicate my next poem to you. I shall have you carved over the arch of my stone doorway. I shall publish your volume of extracts with your portrait on the title page. None of these methods can fully express the extent to which I am yours."

Clover Adams, who maintained a weekly intimate correspondence with her father for most of her life, never referenced concerns or suspicions of a romantic relationship between Adams and Cameron. Neither Clover's family nor friends indicated that she distrusted or was unhappy with her husband. After her death, Henry preserved and cherished an unsent letter by Clover to her sister Ellen which read, "If I had one single point of character or goodness, I would stand on that and grow back to life. Henry is more patient and loving than words can express—God might envy him—he bears and hopes and despairs hour after hour—Henry is beyond all words tenderer and better than all of you even."

On Christmas 1885, Adams sent one of Clover's favorite pieces of jewelry to Cameron, requesting that she "sometimes wear it, to remind you of her."

=== Later life and travels ===
In late 1885, Adams moved into his newly-completed mansion at 1603 H Street, next door to John Hay. The adjoining mansions were the project of Henry Hobson Richardson. The house was razed in 1927 and is the current site of the Hay–Adams Hotel. From 1885 until 1888, Theodore Frelinghuysen Dwight, the chief State Department librarian, lived with Adams at his home at 1603 H Street in Washington, D.C., where he served as Adams's literary assistant, personal secretary, and household manager.

Following his wife's death, Adams took up a restless life as a globetrotter, traveling extensively, spending summers in Paris and winters in Washington, D.C. One of Adams's frequent travel companions was the artist John La Farge, with whom he journeyed to Japan and the South Seas.

=== Death and burial ===
In 1912, Adams suffered a stroke, possibly brought on by news of the sinking of the Titanic on its maiden voyage to New York City; he had purchased tickets for its return voyage. After the stroke, Adams's scholarly output diminished, but he continued to travel, write letters, and host dignitaries and friends at his home.

In the first volume of her autobiography, Eleanor Roosevelt offers a vignette of Adams in old age:

"My first picture of this supposedly stern, rather biting Mr. Adams is of an old gentleman in a victoria outside of our house on N Street. [His secretary] Aileen Tone and I were having tea inside, but Mr. Adams never paid calls. He did, however, request that the children of the house come out and join him in the victoria ... and they brought their Scottie dog and sat and chatted and played all over the vehicle. No one was ever able thereafter to persuade me that Mr. Adams was quite the cynic he was supposed to be. One day after lunch with him, my husband mentioned something which at the time was causing him deep concern in the Government, and Mr. Adams looked at him rather fiercely and said, 'Young man, I have lived in this house many years and seen the occupants of that White House across the square come and go, and nothing that you minor officials or the occupant of that house can do will affect the history of the world for long!'"

On March 27, 1918, Adams died in Washington, D.C. He was interred beside his wife in Rock Creek Cemetery.

== Works and influence ==
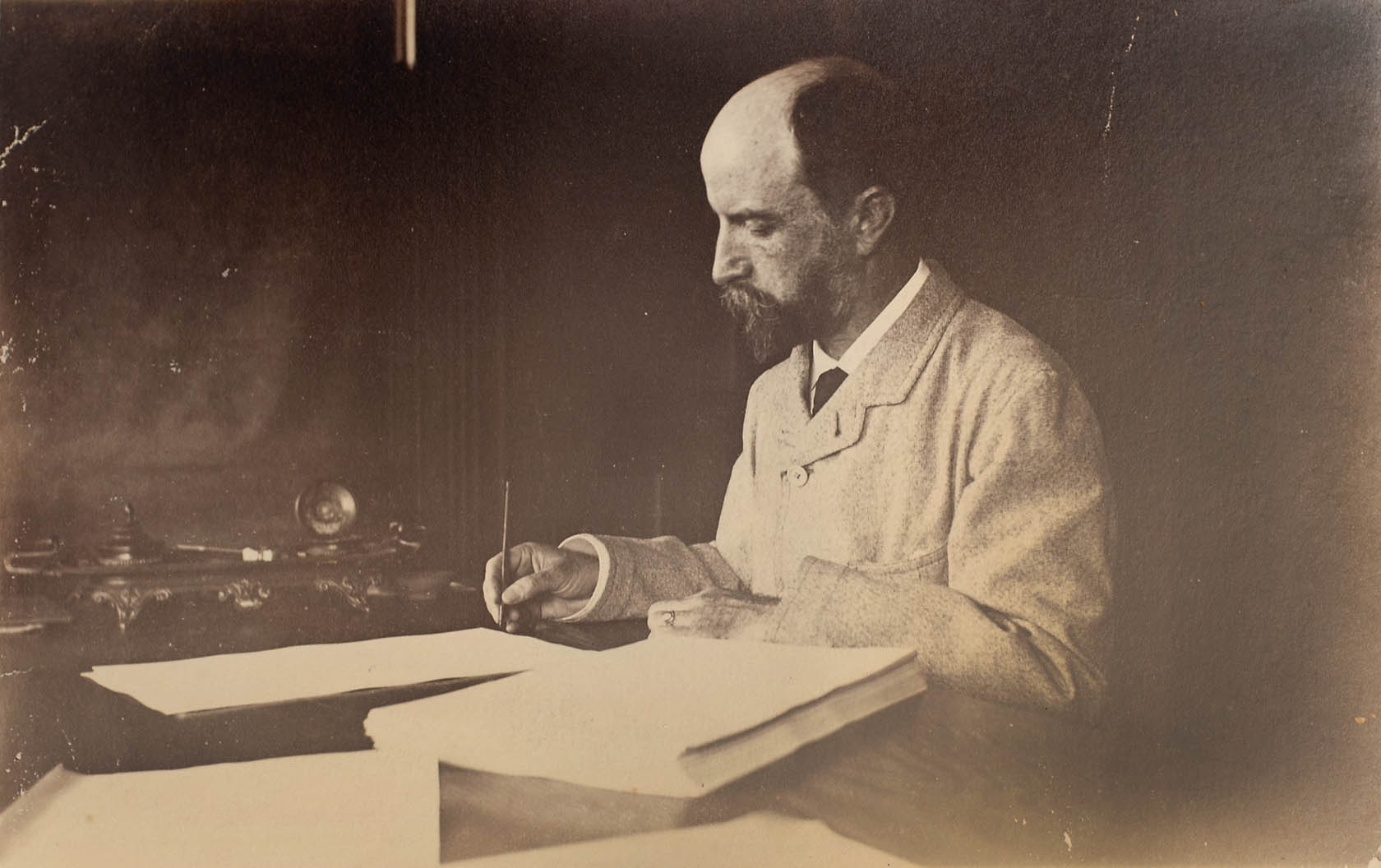
Henry Adams writing at his desk in 1607 H Street in Washington, D.C., 1883, photographed by his wife Clover.

During the late 1860s and early 1870s, Adams edited the North American Review with his brother Charles Jr. During their tenure, the Review published articles exposing corrupt practices in finance, railroads, and government. The brothers collected several of their most important essays in a book titled, Chapters of Erie (1871).

In 1884, Adams was elected a member of the American Antiquarian Society. In 1894, Adams was elected president of the American Historical Association. His address, entitled "The Tendency of History", was delivered in absentia. The essay predicted the development of a scientific approach to history, but was somewhat ambiguous as to what this achievement might mean.

During the 1890s, Adams exercised a profound and fruitful influence over the thought and writings of his younger brother Brooks. Brooks' essay, "The Degradation of the Democratic Dogma", an offshoot of their decades long conversations and correspondence, was published years later.

=== History of the United States during the Administrations of Jefferson and Madison ===
Adams's The History of the United States of America During the Administrations of Thomas Jefferson and James Madison (published 1889–91) is a highly detailed history of the Jefferson and Madison administrations, with a focus on diplomacy. Wide praise was given for its literary merit, especially its opening five chapters, describing the young nation in the year 1800, though later scholars have challenged its accuracy. However, historians have long recognized it as a major and permanent monument in the historiography of the United States. It has been called "a neglected masterpiece" by Garry Wills, and "a history yet to be replaced" by C. Vann Woodward.

=== Mont Saint Michel and Chartres ===
In 1904, Adams privately published Mont Saint Michel and Chartres, a pastiche of history, travel, and poetry that celebrated the unity of medieval society, especially as represented in the great cathedrals of France. Originally meant as a diversion for his nieces and "nieces-in-wish", it was publicly released in 1913 at the request of Ralph Adams Cram, an important American architect, and published with support of the American Institute of Architects.

=== The Education of Henry Adams ===
He published The Education of Henry Adams in 1907, in a small private edition for selected friends. Only following Adams's death was The Education made available to the general public, in an edition issued by the Massachusetts Historical Society. It ranked first on the Modern Library's 1998 list of 100 Best Nonfiction Books and was named the best book of the 20th century by the Intercollegiate Studies Institute, a conservative organization that promotes classical education. It was awarded the Pulitzer Prize in 1919.

Some center-right intellectuals view the book critically. Conservative journalist Fred Siegel considered the worldview expressed therein to be rooted in resentment of America's middle class. "Henry Adams," wrote Siegel, "grounded the intellectual's alienation from American life in the resentment that superior men feel when they are insufficiently appreciated in America's common-man culture."

=== Novels ===
In the 1880s, Adams wrote two novels. Democracy, published anonymously in 1880, became immediately popular in literary circles in England and Europe as well as in America. Its authorship remained a secret during Adams's life. His other novel, published under the nom de plume of Frances Snow Compton, was Esther. It is a blend of philosophy and romance; its titular heroine is believed to be modeled after his wife.

=== Poetry ===
Adams was an accomplished poet and in later life a friend of young poets—notably George Cabot Lodge and Trumbull Stickney—but published nothing in his lifetime. His important poems "Buddha and Brahma" and "Prayers to the Virgin and the Dynamo" are included in the Library of America poetry anthologies for the nineteenth and twentieth centuries, respectively. a half dozen sonnets, a Troubadour translation, and one lyric are scattered through the letters.

== Views ==
Adams was known for his acerbic and sarcastic wit, which colored many of his views. His surviving private letters and commentary are marked by pessimistic predictions of the future decline of American civilization. However, Eleanor Roosevelt wrote, "Henry Adams loved to shock his hearers, and I think he knew that those who were worth their salt would understand him and pick out of the knowledge which flowed from his lips the things which might be useful, and discard the cynicism as an old man's defense against his own urge to be [still] an active factor in the work of the world."

=== Criticisms of corporations and capitalism ===
Adams maintained a critical view of the corporate form, financial centralization, and the growing role of both the economic, social and political life of America for his entire life. On September 20, 1910, he wrote to his younger brother Brooks, "Railways, trusts, banking-system, manufactures, capital and labor, all rest on the principle of monopoly. ... The suggestion that these great corporate organisms, which now perform all the vital functions of our social life, should behave themselves decently, gives away our contention that they have no right to exist. Nor am I prepared to admit that more decency can be attained through a legislature made up of similar people exercising similar illegal powers. ... From top to bottom the whole system is a fraud."

=== Historical entropy ===
In 1910, Adams printed and distributed to university libraries and history professors the small volume A Letter to American Teachers of History proposing a "theory of history" based on the second law of thermodynamics and the principle of entropy. This, essentially, states that all energy dissipates, order becomes disorder, and the earth will eventually become uninhabitable. In short, he applied the physics of dynamical systems of Rudolf Clausius, Hermann von Helmholtz, and William Thomson to the modeling of human history.

In his 1909 manuscript The Rule of Phase Applied to History, Adams attempted to use Maxwell's demon as a historical metaphor, though he seems to have misunderstood and misapplied the principle. Adams interpreted history as a process moving towards "equilibrium", but he saw militaristic nations (he felt Germany pre-eminent in this class) as tending to reverse this process, a "Maxwell's Demon of history".

Adams made many attempts to respond to the criticism of his formulation from his scientific colleagues, but the work remained incomplete at Adams's death in 1918. It was published posthumously.

=== Robert E. Lee ===
Adams said, "I think that Lee should have been hanged. It was all the worse that he was a good man and a fine character and acted conscientiously. It's always the good men who do the most harm in the world."

=== The Virgin Mary ===
In Mont Saint-Michel and Chartres, Adams argues that the previous nineteen hundred years of civilization dating from the birth of Christ had been dominated by the feminine, fertile image of the Blessed Virgin, and that the industrial "dynamo" was a masculine, destructive force which would upend history.

=== Views on race ===
==== Anglo-Saxonism ====
Adams was a prominent Anglo-Saxonist. He considered the United States Constitution as belonging to the Anglo-Saxon race and an expression of "Germanic freedom." He criticized fellow scholars for not being absolute enough in their Anglo-Saxonism, such as William Stubbs, whom he criticized for downplaying the influence of Germanic law and the hundred on English common law.

Modern historians have emphasized his anxieties regarding immigration, particularly immigration from Eastern Europe. Adams wrote of his belief that "the dark races are gaining on us."

==== Antisemitism ====
Adams has been described as antisemitic, and his attitude towards Jews has been described as loathing and paranoid, even by friends. Adams personally wrote, "I detest [the Jews], and everything connected with them, and I live only and solely with the hope of seeing their demise, with all their accursed Judaism. I want to see all the lenders at interest taken out and executed." To a friend, he wrote, "Bombard New York. I know no place that would be more improved by it. The chief population is Jew, and the rest is German Jew." John Hay said that when Adams "saw Vesuvius reddening ... [he] searched for a Jew stoking the fire."

His letters were "peppered with a variety of antisemitic remarks," :

"We are in the hands of the Jews", Adams lamented. "They can do what they please with our values." He advised against investment except in the form of gold locked in a safe deposit box. "There you have no risk but the burglar. In any other form you have the burglar, the Jew, the Czar, the socialist, and, above all, the total irremediable, radical rottenness of our whole social, industrial, financial and political system."

Edward Chalfant's three-volume biography of Adams includes an exhaustive, well-documented examination of Adams's "antisemitism" in its final volume, Improvement of the World. Chalfant attempts to show that most of Adams's references to "Jew" mean "financier," consistent with historical English usage, as evidenced in the Oxford English Dictionary and common among Adams's social class during his lifetime, as well as his own frequent laments that "a priori, or moral, principles" had been replaced with "a bankers' world" and the obnoxious "banking mind."

Adams esteemed individual Jewish personages and Jewish intelligence. In The Education of Henry Adams, he wrote of historian Francis Palgrave that "the reason of his superiority lay in his name, which was Cohen, and his mind which was Cohen also." (Palgrave had changed his name from Cohen upon marriage.) He also praises the Benjamin Disraeli over Palmerston, Russell and Gladstone, writing, "Complex these gentlemen were not. Disraeli alone might, by contrast, be called complex." Adams was also a close personal friend of the art critic and historian Bernard Berenson, though he made a number of antisemitic remarks at Berenson's expense.

== Writings by Adams ==
- 1876. Essays in Anglo-Saxon Law (with Henry Cabot Lodge, Ernest Young and J.L. Laughlin)
- 1879. Life of Albert Gallatin
- 1879. The Writings of Albert Gallatin (as editor, three volumes)
- 1880. Democracy: An American Novel (published anonymously)
- 1882. John Randolph
- 1884. Esther: A Novel (published anonymously) (facsimile ed., 1938, Scholars' Facsimiles & Reprints, ISBN 978-0-8201-1187-2)
- 1889–1891. History of the United States During the Administrations of Thomas Jefferson and James Madison (nine volumes)
- 1891. Historical Essays
- 1893. Tahiti: Memoirs of Arii Taimai e Marama of Eimee ... Last Queen of Tahiti (facsimile of the 1901 Paris ed., 1947 Scholars' Facsimiles & Reprints, ISBN 978-0-8201-1213-8)
- 1904. Mont Saint Michel and Chartres
- 1910. A Letter to American Teachers of History @ Internet Archive
- 1911. The Life of George Cabot Lodge (facsimile ed. 1978, Scholars' Facsimiles & Reprints, ISBN 978-0-8201-1316-6)
- 1918. The Education of Henry Adams (published privately)
- 1919. The Degradation of the Democratic Dogma
- 1930–1938. Letters (Edited by W.C. Ford, two volumes)
- 1982. The Letters of Henry Adams, Volumes 1–3: 1858–1892 (edited by J.C. Levenson, Ernest Samuels and Charles Vandersee)
- 1988. The Letters of Henry Adams, Volumes 4–6: 1892–1918 (edited by J.C. Levenson, Ernest Samuels and Charles Vandersee)

=== Reprinted ===
- Democracy: An American Novel, Esther, Mont Saint Michel and Chartres, The Education of Henry Adams (Ernest Samuels, ed.) (Library of America, 1983) ISBN 978-0-940450-12-7
- History of the United States During the Administrations of Thomas Jefferson and James Madison (Earl N. Harbert, ed.) (Library of America, 1986) Vol I (Jefferson) ISBN 978-0-940450-34-9. Vol II (Madison) ISBN 978-0-940450-35-6
