= Albertus Parisiensis =

12th-century medieval French composer

Albertus Parisiensis (fl. 1146–1177), also known as Albert of Paris, was a French cantor and composer. He is credited with creating the first known piece of European music for three voices.

== Life and career ==
Parisiensis was probably born in Estampes in the Arrondissement of Mirande. He served as canon at Notre Dame de Paris from 1127 and as cantor by 1146, a position he held until his death in 1177, the only period of his life which has been documented. He left a number of liturgical books to the cathedral.

The only extant piece of his is the conductus Congaudeant Catholici. The piece was part of the Codex Calixtinus, a work intended as a guide for travelers making the Way of St. James, a pilgrimage to a shrine in Santiago de Compostela. Congaudeant Catholici has been recorded by a number of groups devoted to medieval music, including Sequentia, The Rose Ensemble and others.

== Selected recordings ==
- The Age of Cathedrals with Paul Hillier and Theatre of Voices, Harmonia Mundi, HMU 907157.

== Sources ==
- Fuller, Sarah (2001). "Albertus Parisiensis". Grove Music Online. Oxford: Oxford University Press. doi:10.1093/gmo/9781561592630.article.00457. ISBN 978-1-56159-263-0. (subscription, Wikilibrary access, or UK public library membership required)
- Wright, Craig (2008) [1989]. Music and Ceremony at Notre Dame of Paris, 500–1550. Cambridge Studies in Music Series. Cambridge: Cambridge University Press. ISBN 978-0-521-08834-3.
