= Snows Court =

Alley in Washington, D.C.

Coordinates: 38.9015°N 77.0523°W

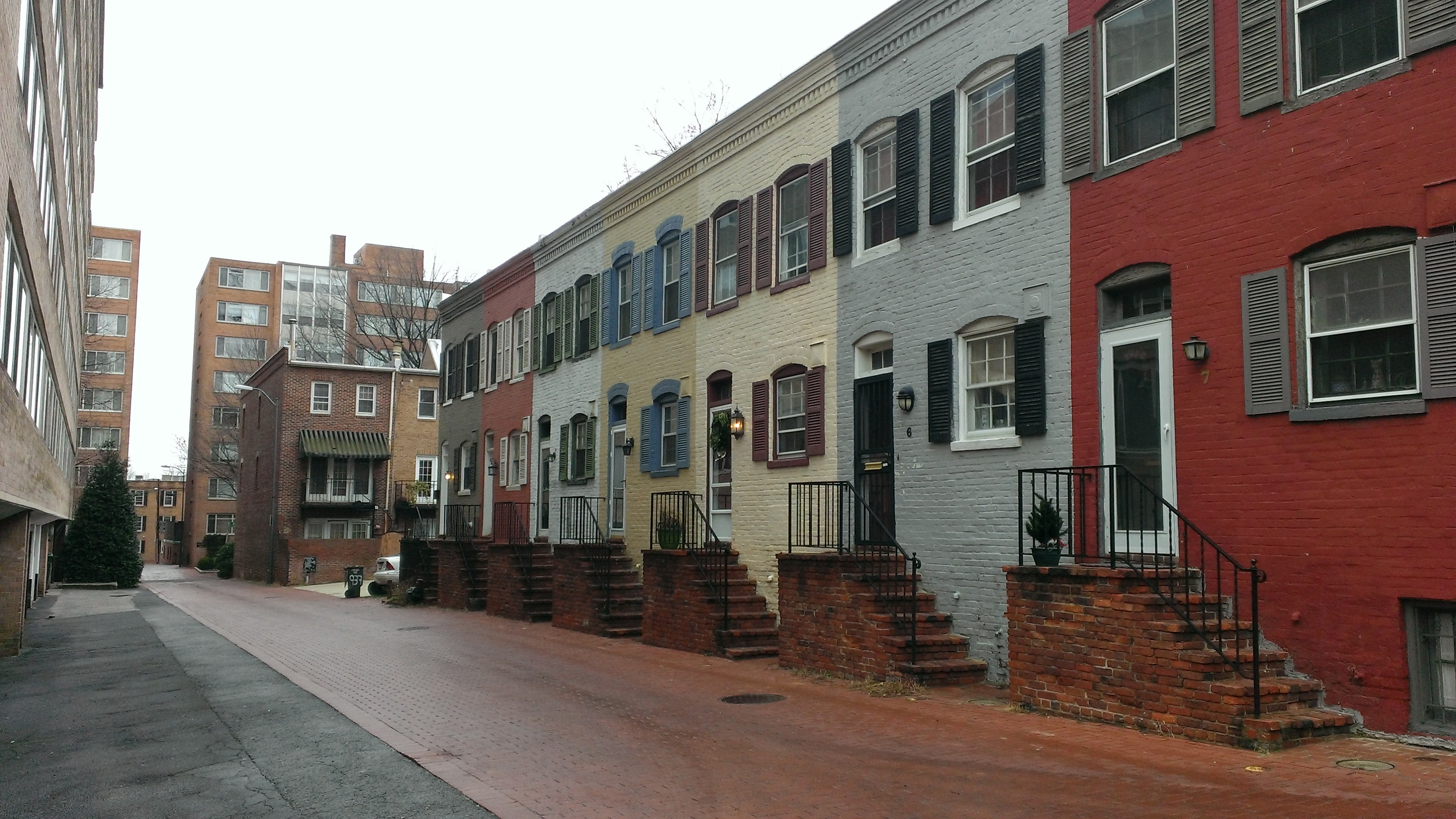
Picture of Housing Residences within Snows Court 2013

Snow's Court is an alley of historic dwellings located in the Foggy Bottom neighborhood in Washington, D.C.

== Origin and early history (1850–1880) ==
Formerly known as "Snow's Alley," this historical dwelling was founded on Lot 1 of Square 28 within Foggy Bottom's Historic District, primarily industrial district in the year 1858, the lot itself being situated between 24th and 25th Streets and I and K Streets NW (intersecting with New Hampshire Avenue) as indicated by the empty lot in the southeast (bottom right-hand) corner of the block in Boschke's 1857 map of Washington City.

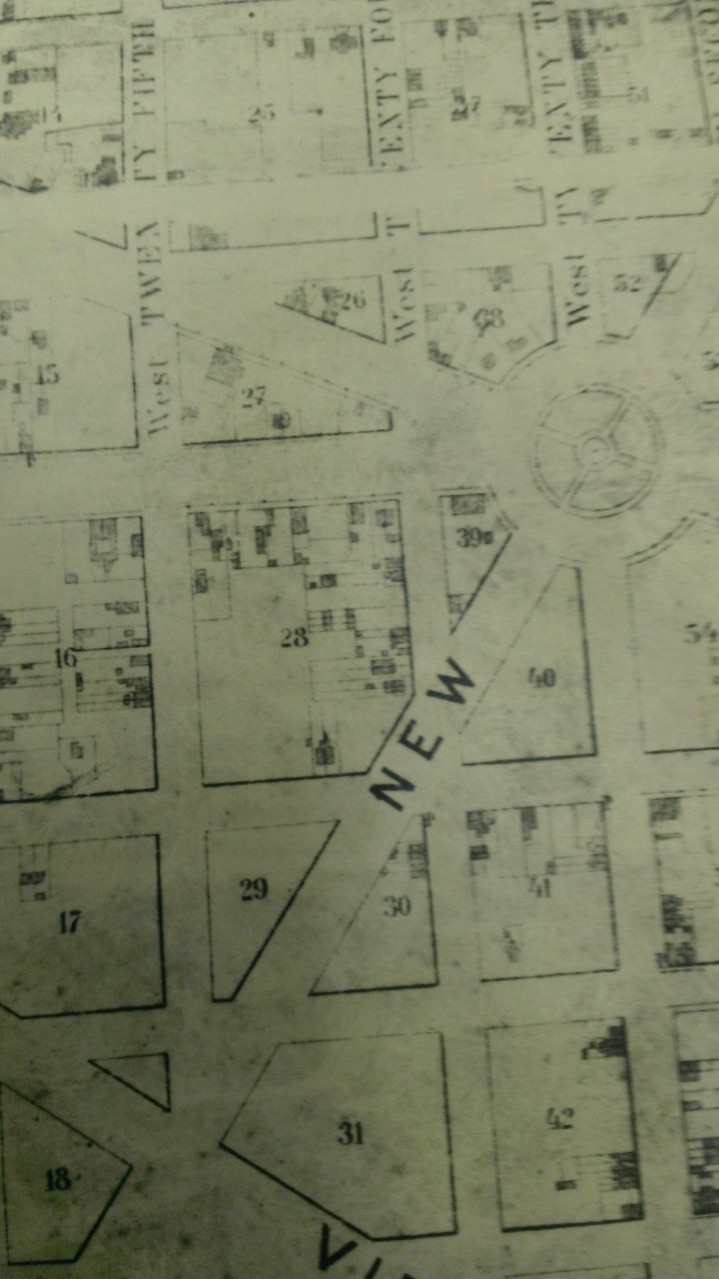
Zoomed in section of Albert Boschke's Map of Washington City depicting the location of Snow's Court in Square 28. The streets displayed are 25th, 24th, 23rd, H, I, K, and L.

Snow's Court was originally constructed by C.A. Snow, a private landowner and long-time resident of Foggy Bottom, as well as the publisher of one of Washington, D.C.'s foremost news publications, the National Intelligencer. Snow subdivided his lot into several smaller installations as shown in G.M. Hopkins's map of Snow's Court in 1887.

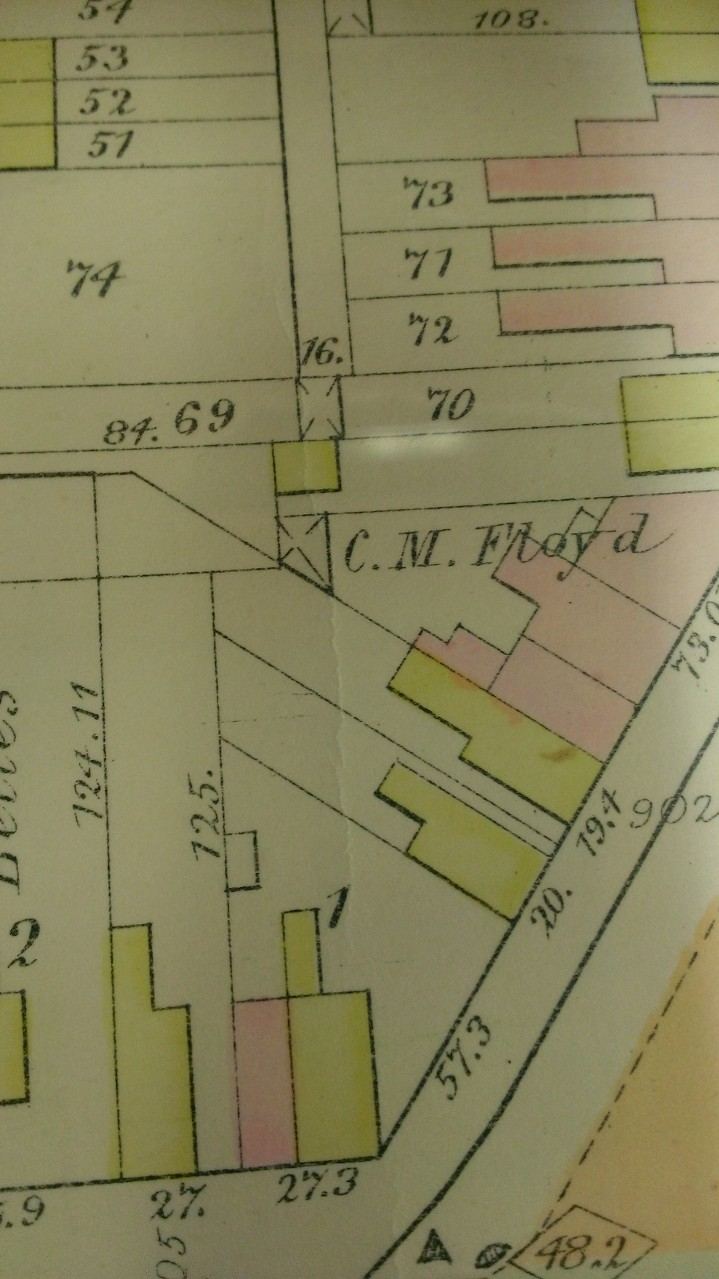
Zoomed in section of Hopkin's Plat Map of Washington, D.C., 1887, depicting the location of Snow's property in Square 28 (Lot 1)

These include construction of a greenhouse (relatively larger in comparison than standard alley home plot) and an additional four frame-houses. Snow rented these subdivided plots to four Irish immigrants, one of whom Snow was reported to have personally employed at the greenhouse to tend to its upkeep. Snow himself most likely resided off-site.

== Social life ==
At its founding, Snow's Court was home to a predominately Irish population, but during the Civil War the Union Army used it as a barracks for disabled soldiers, evicting the Irish tenants. After the Civil War, an influx of freed African Americans came to city looking for housing. With few low-income options, they flocked to the alleys, including Snow's Court. This dramatic increase in population led to severe overcrowding, which exacerbated other problems such as unsanitary living situations and the spread of disease.

Snow's Court was one of Washington's many working class alleyways, which had a history of high crime rates and a reputation for being dangerous during the late 19th and 20th centuries. Residents were linked by ties of mutual aid, and each alley was a close-knit neighborhood where members knew each other on sight and excluded outsiders. Middle-class Washington residents in particular were unlikely to enter the alleys. Their defensive attitude made it difficult for people to move in, but once a person became part of the alley they were involved in the community for a lifetime.

== Living conditions ==
By the end of 1870, Snow's Court had over 300 inhabitants, far more than the dwellings were equipped to house. In the early 1870s, the Board of Health considered the dwellings uninhabitable. In the Second Annual Report of the Board of Health, there were over 1,500 nuisances in alley dwellings in 1873. These nuisances included overcrowding, no drainage, leaking roofs, low-grade building structures, insufficient sheltering conditions, and disease epidemics.

From the results of this preliminary investigation the objections to our alleys may be summarized as follows:

- (1) The existence of blind alleys or cul-de-sacs shutting off small communities from the outside world and which are calculated not only to promote sickness, but also immorality and crime.
- (2) The undue prevalence of immorality and crime, since it may be taken for granted that the majority of alley tenants suffer positive deterioration from witnessing the uncurbed vice around them.
- (3) High rents in proportion to the income of the families, especially in consideration of the accommodations offered and the actual value of the property.

Health officials also explained that the shanties and uninhabitable homes were overcrowded with families who were too poor to afford any better living conditions. Because the alleys were mostly filled with poor blacks during this time, sanitation in them was not addressed and fixed until years later through demolition. Before their demolition, officials explained the immediate need for action in the alleys, whether they directly impacted the citizens of Washington or not.

…I would that I could make my language convincing to every citizen of Washington who values his health and that of his family, so convincingly that he would not rest until every squalid shanty and its aggregation of poisonous filth be wiped out of existence, the alleys, all of every width, sewered and have a sufficient number of proper traps, be paved with substantial concrete pavements, water plugs at convenient points, and every morning of the year be flushed thoroughly, and such exact regulations enforced as will prevent the deposit of anything obnoxious therein. Out of sight, therefore out of mind, must not any longer be said of these alleys, and I cannot leave this subject which I know is vital to the cause in which we labor, without urging again that the Board initiate such action as will secure the desired object....

The Board of Health stated that the environment gave no incentive for progress, learning, or success, and instead it provided a breeding ground for deadly diseases and horrendous crimes. The Board of Health also explained that sanitization should be a big issue and that these slums should be cleaned up to help the community not destroy it. "...[L]ift them out of these reeking slums, and provide for their living where the free air and sunlight will elevate their lives, and give them health in a place of filth, crowd, poison, and contagion."

== Snow's Court today ==
Snow's Court is now considered prime real estate for the Foggy Bottom neighborhood and many of the homes are owned by middle to upper-middle class white people. This is a complete change in direction from the dilapidated slum it once was. The shift can be attributed to the set of reforms put in place by individuals particularly invested in the cleaning up of these breeding grounds for disease and crime. These individuals included President Franklin D. Roosevelt and First Lady Eleanor Roosevelt, who both sought out to discontinue the development of alley dwellings as part of the New Deal. James Borchert documents the steady decline in alley dwelling in his maps detailing the number of residents in alleys around D.C. in 1927 and 1970. Looking at the maps one can see that in 1927 there were over 50 dwellings remaining in Snow's Court, but by 1970, only 20–29 remained.

Upon entering Snow's Court, perhaps the most prominent remnants of the site are the brick alley dwelling structures established during both governmental and private investors' renovation of the area during the Civil War used to house military personnel, as well as several other multi-story dwellings that were built on the surrounding lots between 1880-1910 after their owners were issued permits to construct new dwellings on Square 28.

When observing Sasche's "Bird's Eye View" map of the city of Washington in 1884, it is evident that the structures in this depiction are still present today, including the residences on Lots 24 and 25, which initially consisted of 13 two-story brick dwellings constructed the year of this map's production.

Although not many of the present structures are reflected by Sasche's diagram, it is historically accurate, as those two lots, in addition to the frame buildings dotted along the exterior of C.A. Snow's, were among the only to be granted a permit for construction as housing residences at this time (other more significant construction within the alley took place after this year represented). Such frame houses had in time been replaced with brick structures. In terms of preserved architecture, there are a few larger dwelling facilities that did not appear to have been in continued use, but were not razed as were condemned buildings in other squares (perhaps out of historical preservation, as some buildings were affixed with plaques detailing their significance).

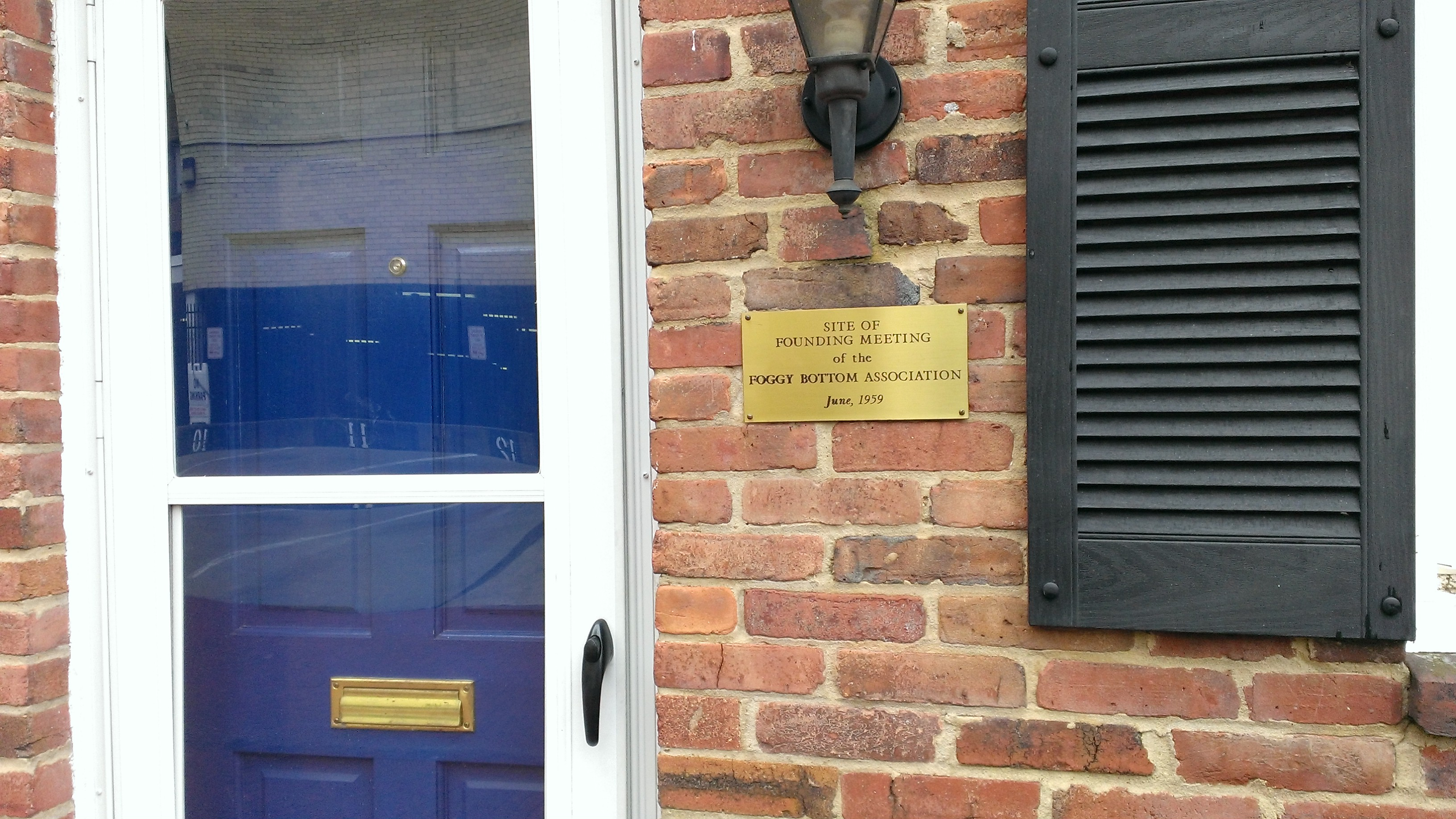
Site of the Founding Meeting of the Foggy Bottom Association in Snows Court, Washington, D.C. (June 1959)

There were, however, large apartment complexes within the square on the opposite side that very well could have replaced these buildings for sanitary health purposes and space efficiency.

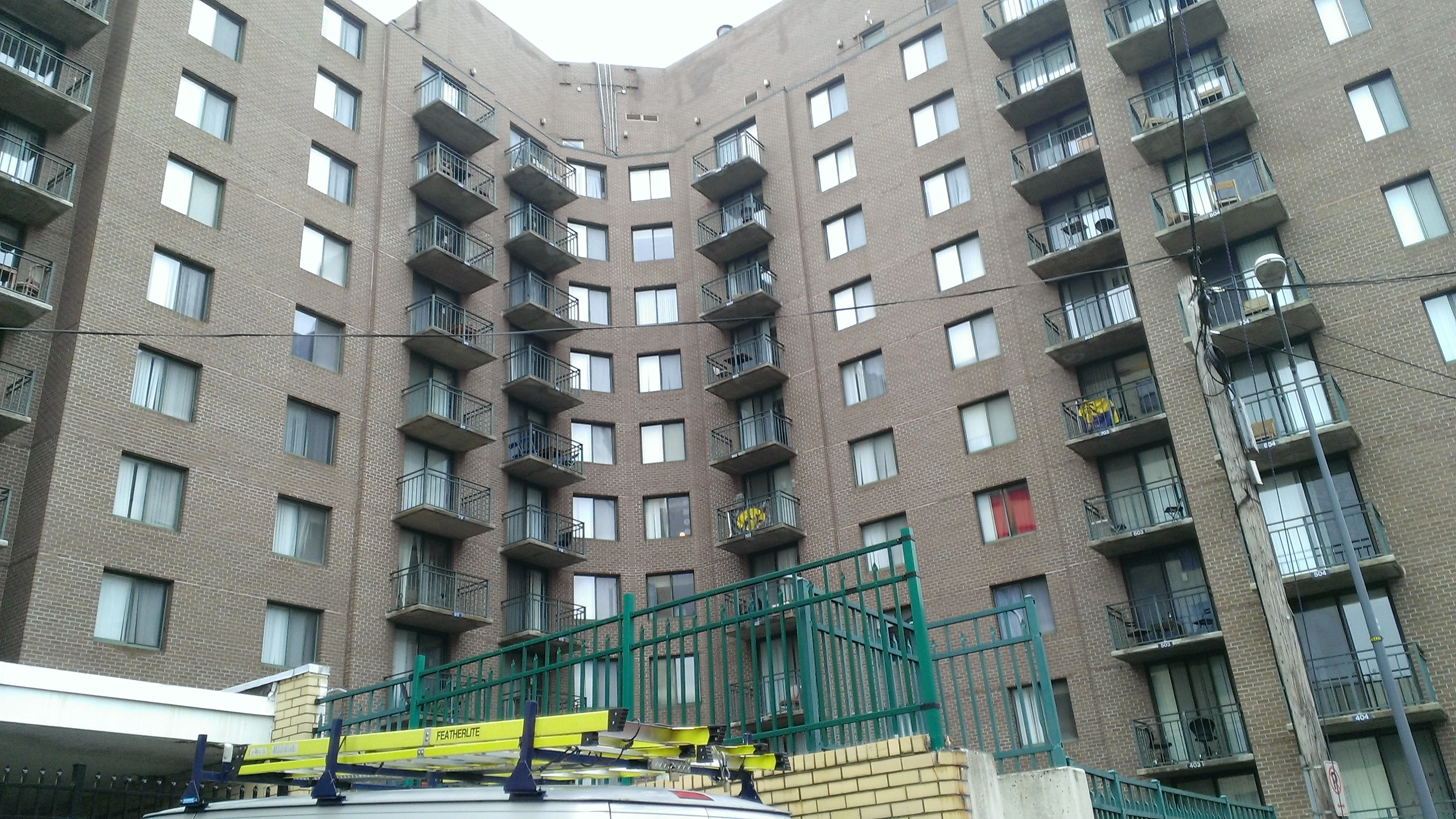
City Hall Apartment Complex, Snows Court, Washington, D.C.

There are also many buildings that have been re-plastered in certain places – filling damaged locations that compromised structural integrity with newer material (brick, or boarded with a hard polymer) and cement that can be quite obviously discerned when juxtaposed with older, worn brick from initial construction on building facades.

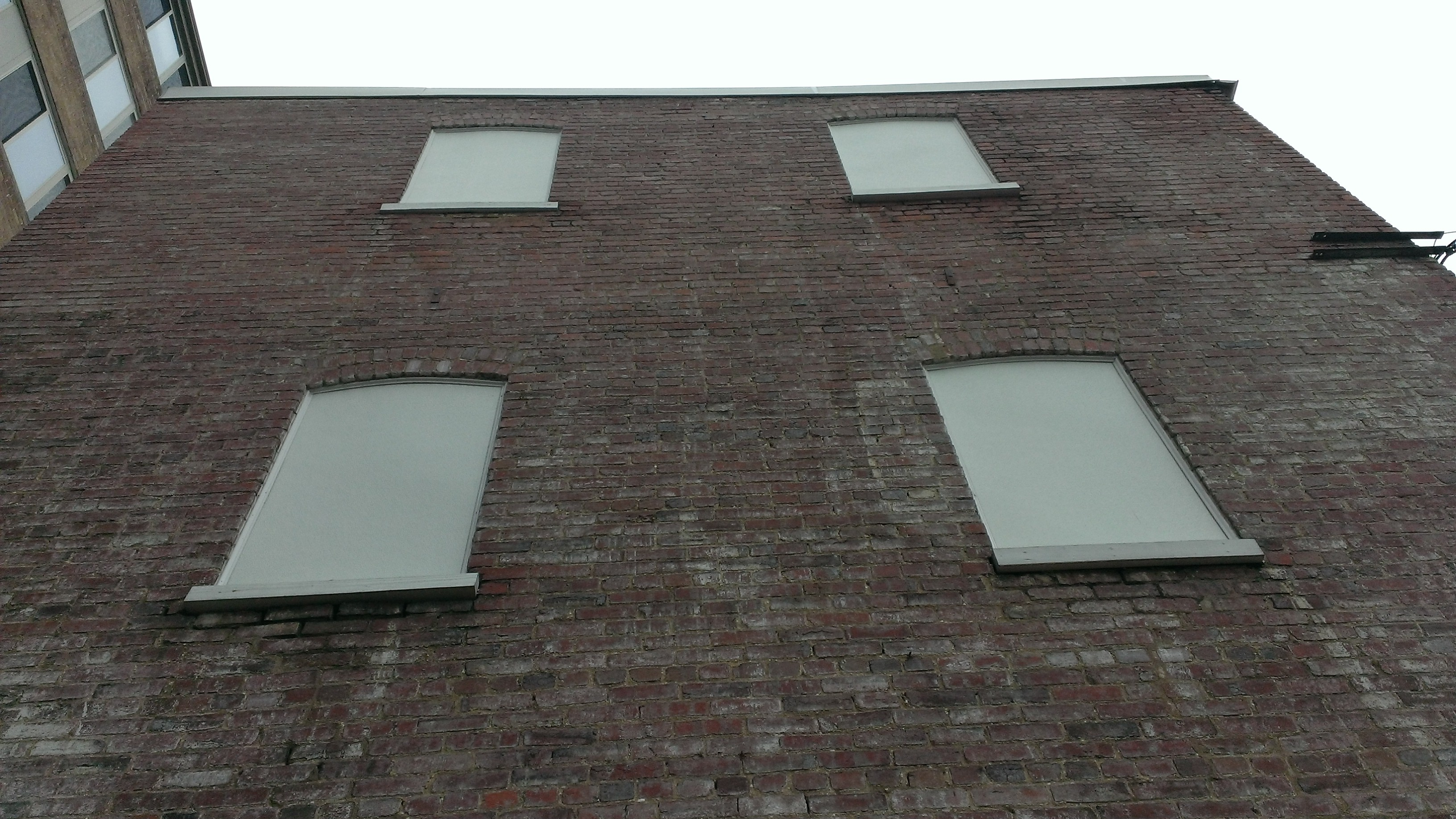
Shows replastered apartment style building from the site's initial construction

While some of the larger complexes were not in use, many of the smaller, individual residences built during the Civil War were still in current usage by Foggy Bottom citizens as modern-day dwellings that have preserved the architecture from their initial construction.

Although the allure of convenience to industry in the surrounding area has decreased in relevance with the advent of affordable public transit and automobiles (in addition to garage space also available in the alley), Snow's Court still remains consistent in fulfilling its intended purpose to serve as homes for citizens of Foggy Bottom.

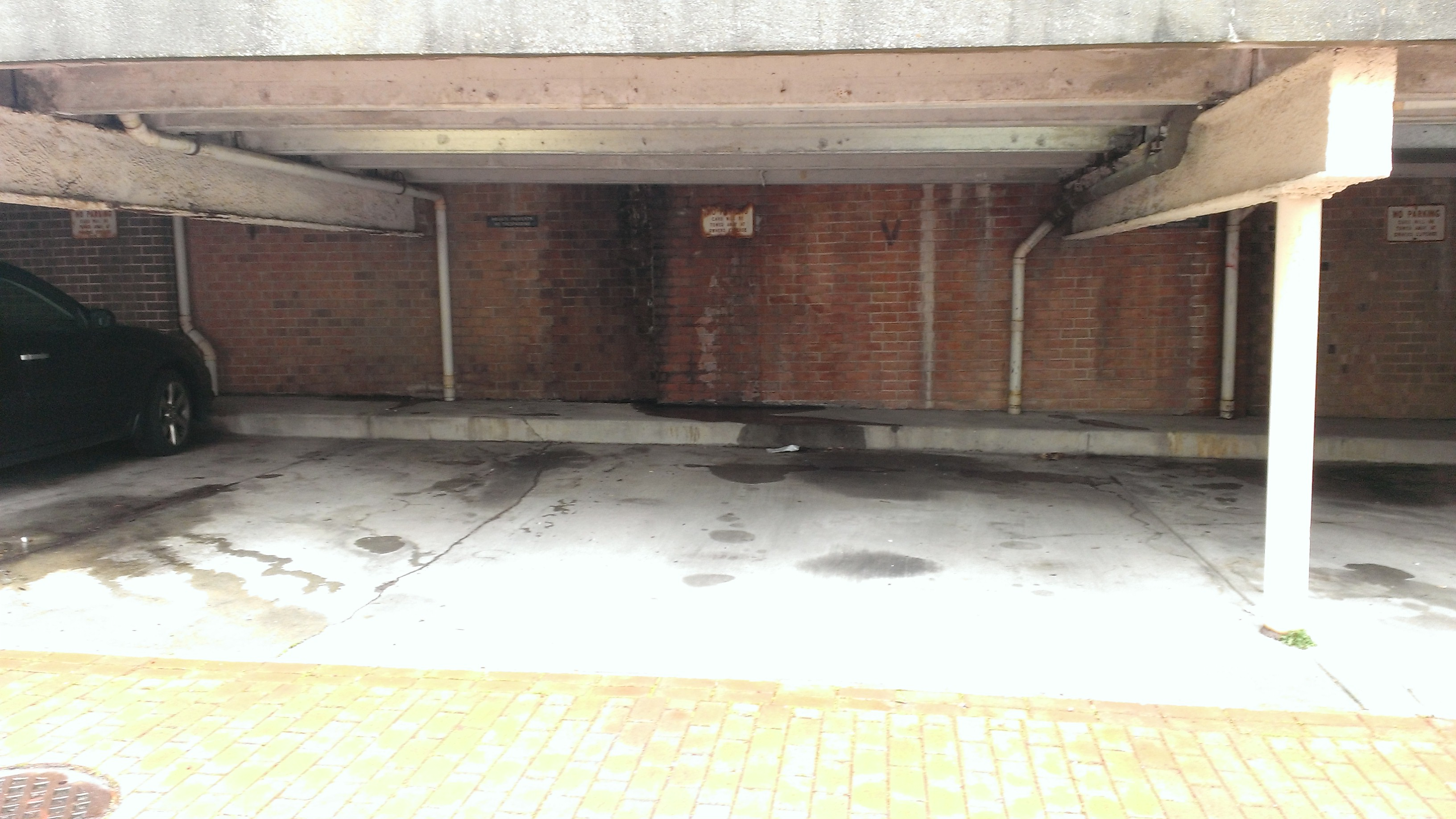
Parking spaces located in Snows Court, Washington, D.C.
