= John Ihlder =

Washington D.C. government official

- Born: John Ihlder

John Ihlder was the executive officer of the Washington D.C. Alley Dwelling Authority and its successor agency the National Capital Housing Authority. Prior to those positions, Ihlder was a reporter for the New York Evening Sun, and he also served for a short time on the Municipal Affairs Committee of the Grand Rapids, Michigan Board of Trade.

Ihlder was a strong supporter of public housing, and while directing the Alley Dwelling Authority, he refused to demolish slum residences until adequate public housing units were available for displaced persons. He also took a stand against white residents of Washington who sought to reserve public housing units for themselves, and ensured that the St. Mary's Court development in Foggy Bottom would be available for black residents. Later, during the slum clearance and redevelopment of southwest Washington D.C. in the 1950s, he staunchly opposed plans to reduce the number of affordable housing units in the redevelopment plan.

Part of the John Ihlder Papers are at the Franklin D. Roosevelt Library in Hyde Park, New York.
