= The History of the United States of America 1801–1817 =

9-volume book by Henry Adams, 1889–1891

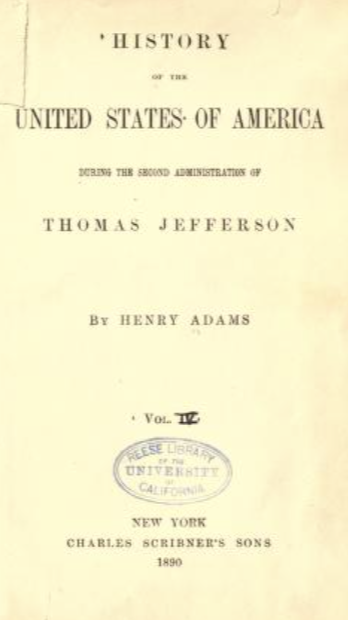
- Author: Henry Adams
- Language: English
- Genre: Non-fiction
- Publication date: 1889-1891
- Publication place: United States

The History of the United States of America, 1801–1817, also known as The History of the United States of America During the Administrations of Thomas Jefferson and James Madison, is a nine-volume history written by American intellectual Henry Adams. It was first published between 1889 and 1891. The entire work has been reprinted many times, most often in a two-volume format. Historian Garry Wills described it as "the greatest prose masterpiece of non-fiction in America in the 19th century." The critic and poet Dan Chiasson also praised the book's singular reputation, writing in The New Yorker, "To many, it is the greatest work of history written by an American."

The first six chapters of the first volume have also been published separately as America in 1800.
