= Quincy City Hall =

- Quincy Town Hall
- U.S. National Register of Historic Places
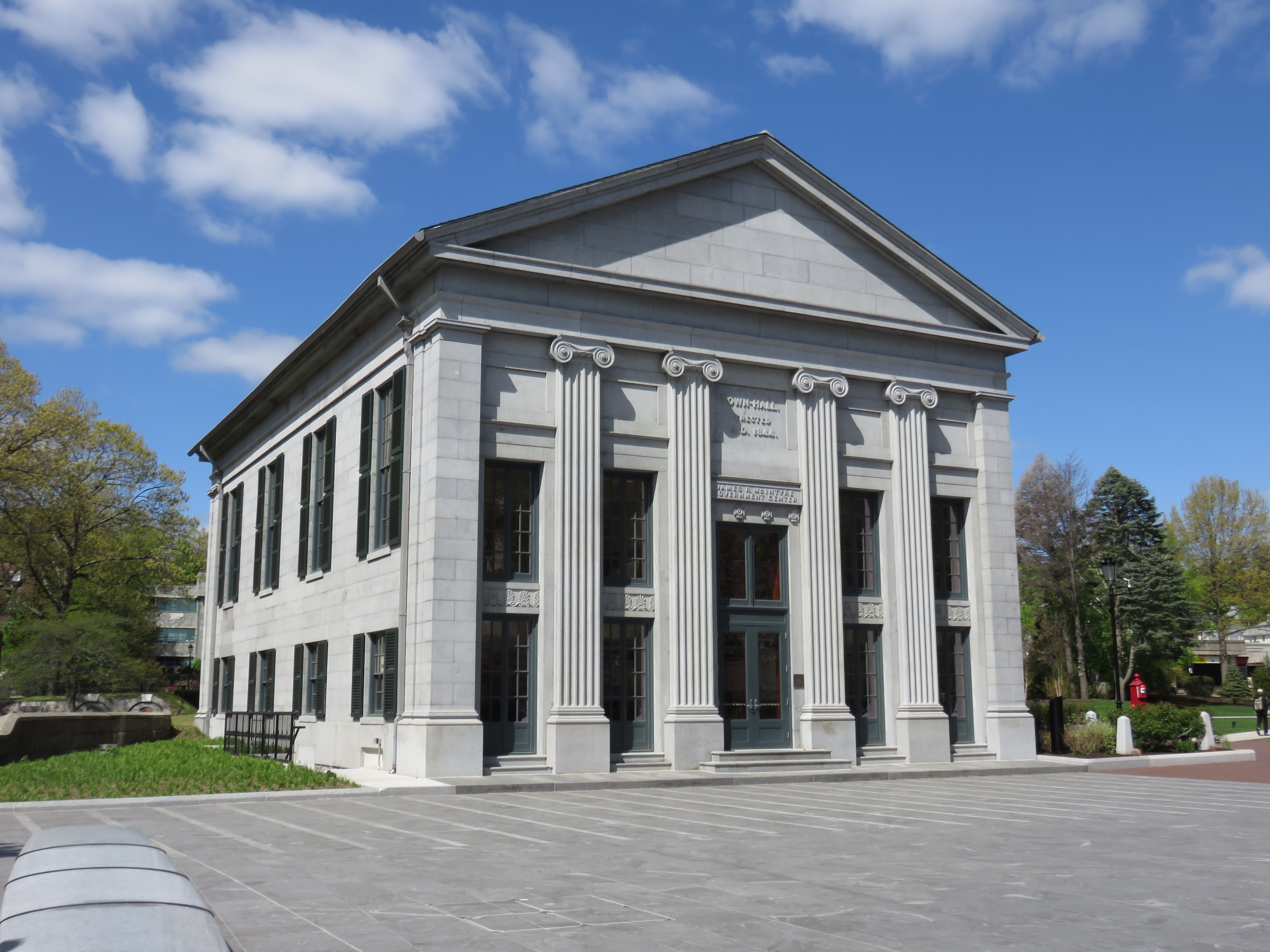
- Quincy City Hall in 2019

- Location within Massachusetts Location within the United States
- Location: 1305 Hancock St., Quincy, Massachusetts
- Coordinates: 42°15′4″N 71°0′13″W
- Built: 1844
- Architect: Willard, Solomon
- Architectural style: Greek Revival
- NRHP reference No.: 80000649
- Added to NRHP: January 11, 1980

Quincy City Hall is the seat of government for the City of Quincy, Massachusetts. The historic town hall building at 1305 Hancock Street in Quincy Center was built in 1844. It is a somewhat monumental example of Greek Revival architecture, featuring a temple front with two-story Ionic pilasters and a triangular pediment. Elements of the main facade were significantly altered when the town was converted to a city in 1888. It has been the seat of local government since its construction. Also known as the James R. McIntyre Government Center.

The building was listed on the National Register of Historic Places in 1980 (as "Quincy Town Hall").

== See also ==
- National Register of Historic Places listings in Quincy, Massachusetts
