= Montclair (Quincy, Massachusetts) =

Neighbourhood of Quincy, Massachusetts, United States

Coordinates: 42°16′15″N 71°02′08″W

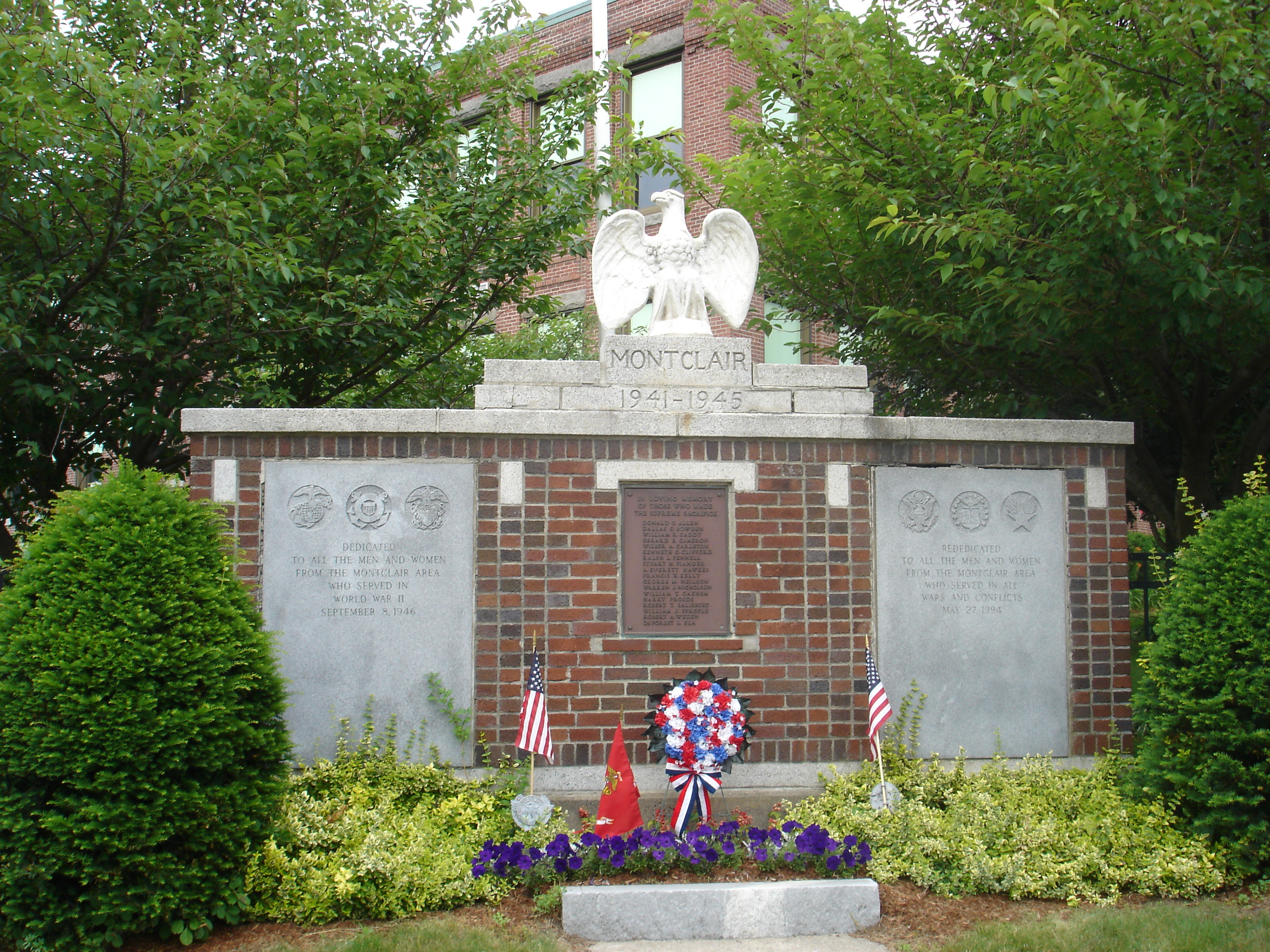
WWII memorial outside Montclair Elementary School

Montclair is a neighborhood of Quincy, Massachusetts.

The neighborhood is separated from Boston by the Neponset River, and roughly follows West Squantum Street from Newport Avenue to the Milton town line, extending approximately to Hobart Street.

== History ==
Originally part of Dorchester, the neighborhood - then largely uninhabited farmland and marshland - was annexed to Quincy in 1792.

Most of the neighborhood was built and settled in the early 1900s, when real estate entrepreneurs began subdividing the farmland for Boston's nascent growth into the suburbs. The Micah Pope farm was one of the largest to be subdivided, in 1883, and the developer who did so was responsible for the name "Montclair."

William R. Caddy, a Marine who was awarded the Medal of Honor for his heroism in World War II, was a native of Montclair.

Major landmarks include the Montclair Elementary School, Montclair Park, Bishop Field and the Presidents' Golf Course.

== Transportation ==
Montclair is next to the North Quincy MBTA Red Line station, and MBTA bus route 211 (Squantum-Quincy Center) services it.
