= Quincy, Massachusetts =

- City
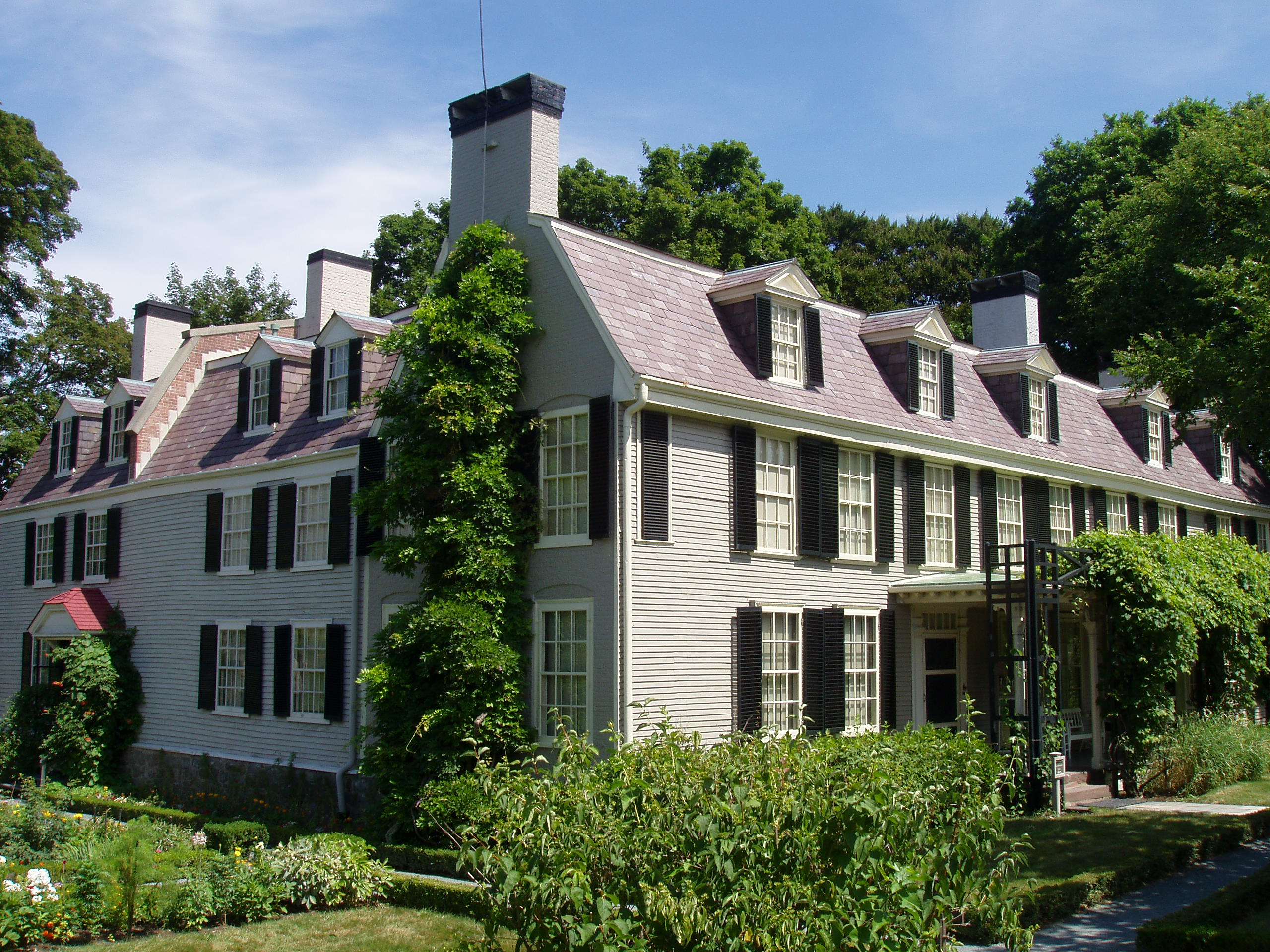
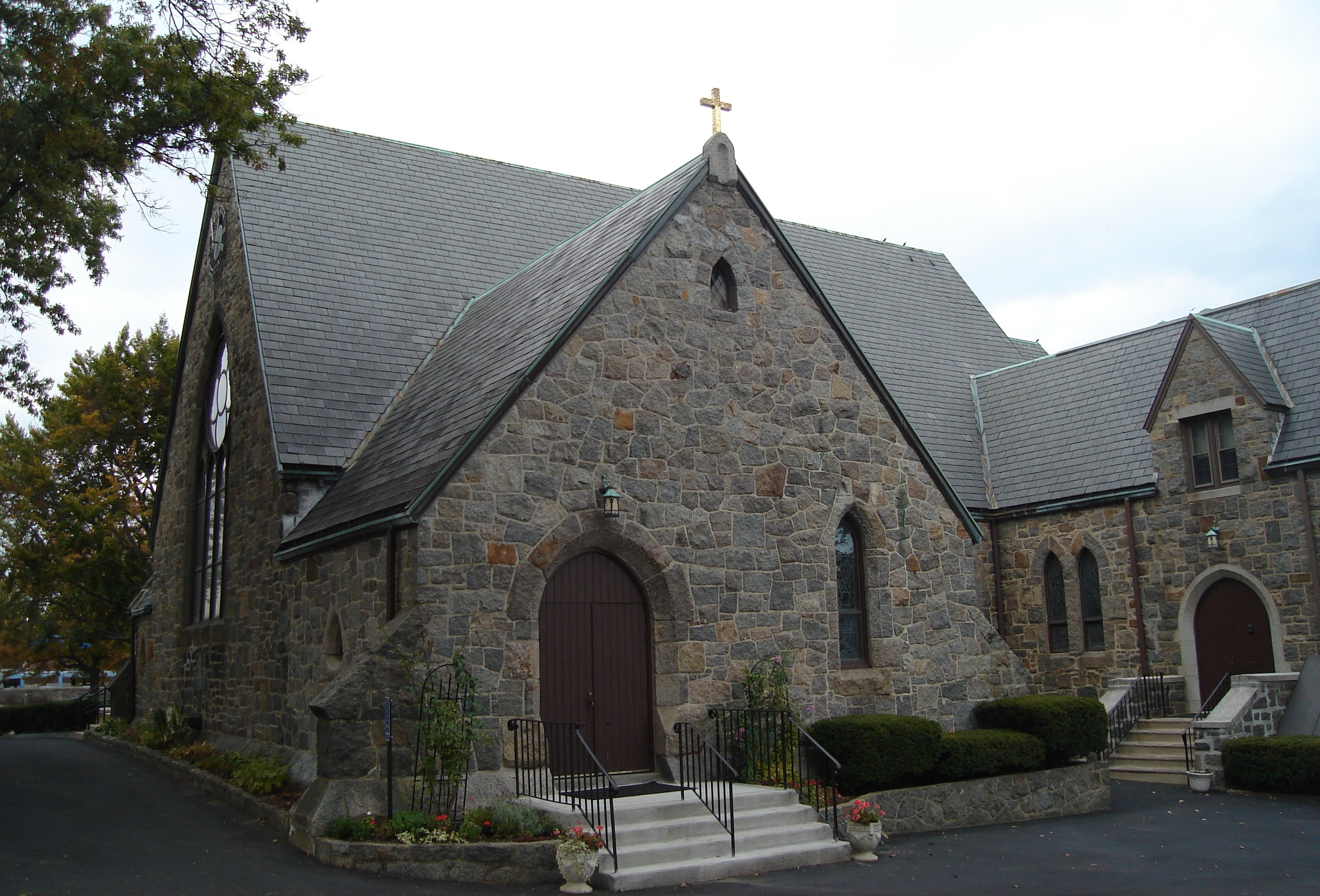
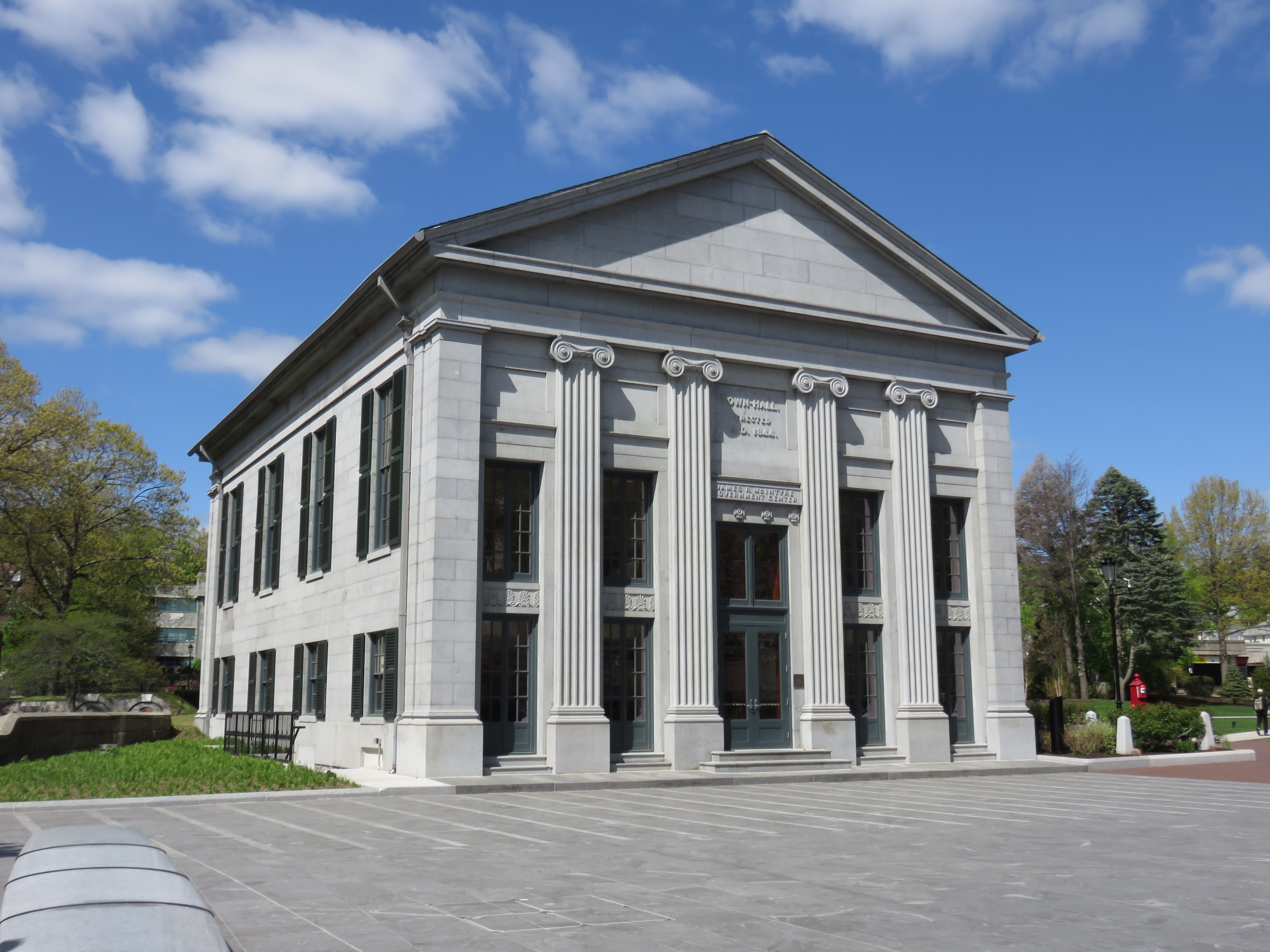
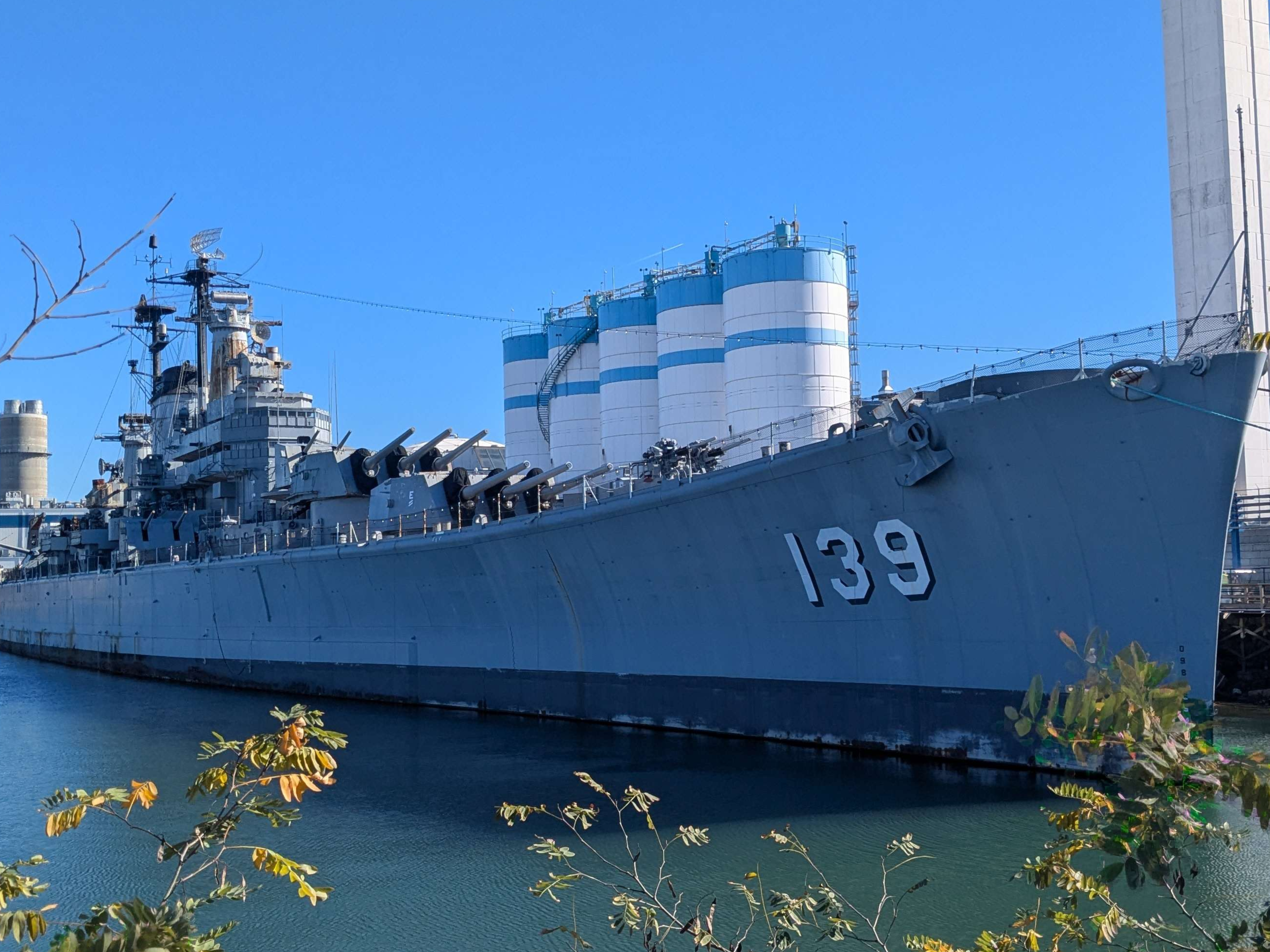
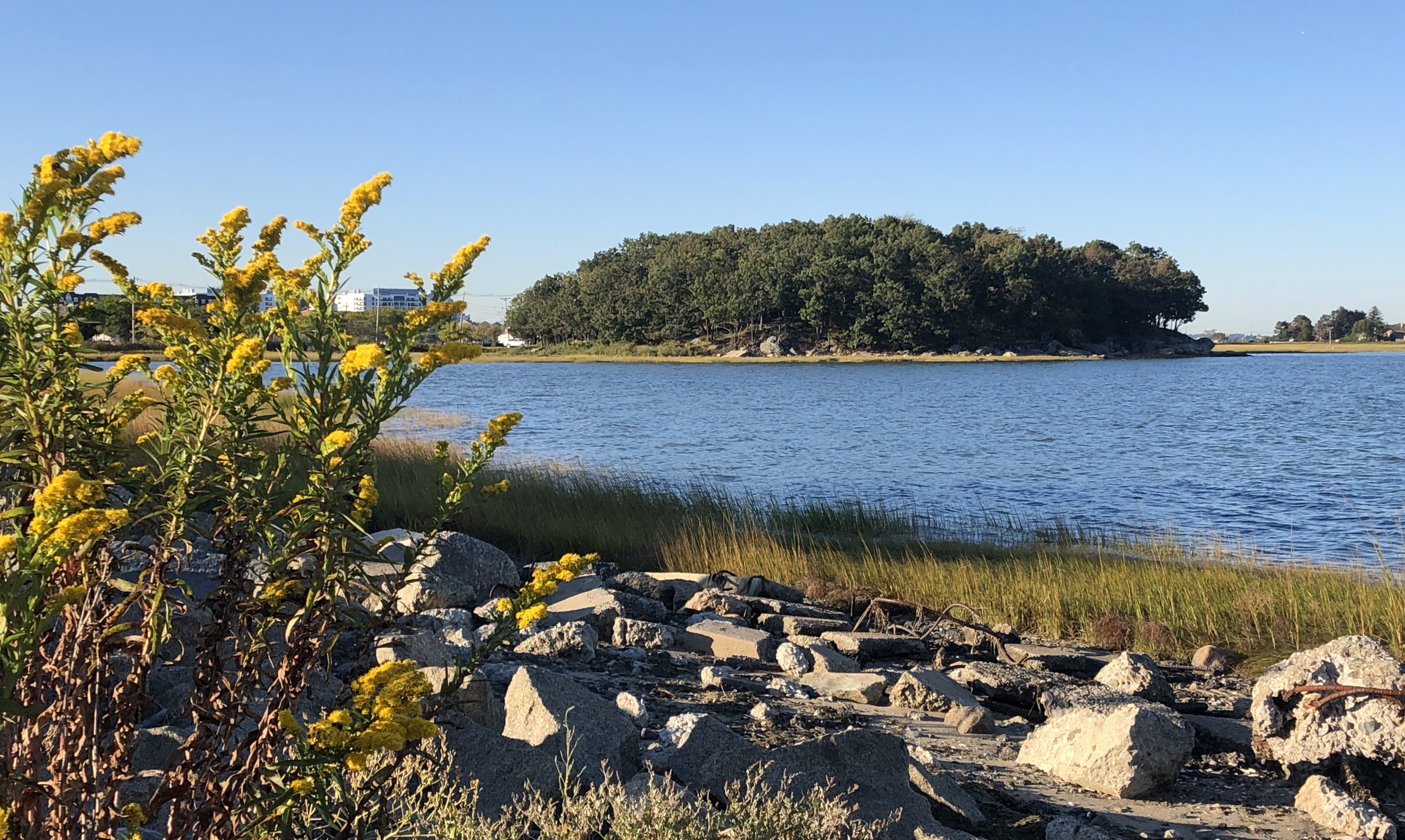
- Quincy Center Peacefield Christ Church Quincy Town Hall USS Salem Moswetuset Hummock

- Flag Seal
- Nickname: "City of Presidents"
- Motto: "Manet" (Latin) "It Remains"
- Location of Quincy in Norfolk County, Massachusetts

- Location within Greater Boston area Location within Massachusetts Location within the United States
- Coordinates: 42°15′N 71°0′W
- Country: United States
- State: Massachusetts
- County: Norfolk
- Region: New England
- Settled: 1625
- Incorporated (town): 1792
- Incorporated (city): 1888
- Named for: John Quincy

Government
  - Type: Mayor–council
  - Mayor: Thomas P. Koch
  - City Council: At-Large: Noel DiBona; At-Large: Anne Mahoney (president); At-Large: Ziqiang Yuan; Ward 1: David Jacobs; Ward 2: Richard Ash; Ward 3: Walter Hubley; Ward 4: Virginia Ryan; Ward 5: Maggie McKee; Ward 6: Deborah Riley

Area
  - Total: 26.91 sq mi (69.69 km^{2})
  - Land: 16.57 sq mi (42.92 km^{2})
  - Water: 10.34 sq mi (26.77 km^{2})
- Elevation: 30 ft (9 m)
- Highest elevation: 517 ft (158 m)
- Lowest elevation: 0 ft (0 m)

Population (2020)
  - Total: 101,636
  - Density: 6,132.8/sq mi (2,367.87/km^{2})
- Time zone: UTC−5 (Eastern)
  - Summer (DST): UTC−4 (Eastern)
- ZIP Code: 02169–02171
- Area codes: 617 and 857
- FIPS code: 25-55745
- GNIS feature ID: 0617701
- Website: quincyma.gov

Quincy (English pronunciation: /ˈkwɪn.zi/) is a city in Norfolk County, Massachusetts, United States. It is the largest city in the county. Quincy is part of the Greater Boston area as one of Boston's immediate southern suburbs. Its population in 2020 was 101,636, making it the seventh-largest city in the state. Known as the "City of Presidents", Quincy is the birthplace of two U.S. presidents—John Adams and his son John Quincy Adams—as well as John Hancock, the first signer of the Declaration of Independence and the first and third governor of Massachusetts.

First settled in 1625, Quincy was briefly part of Dorchester before becoming the North Precinct of Braintree in 1640. In 1792, Quincy was split off from the Town of Braintree and was incorporated separately as the Town of Quincy; the new town was named after Colonel John Quincy, maternal grandfather of Abigail Adams and after whom John Quincy Adams was also named. Quincy became a city in 1888.

For over a century, Quincy was home to a thriving granite quarrying industry; the city was also the site of the Granite Railway, the United States' first commercial railroad. Shipbuilding at the Fore River Shipyard was another key contributor to the city's economy. In the 20th century, both Howard Johnson's and Dunkin' Donuts were founded in the city. Today, Quincy has developed into both a vibrant immigrant destination and a suburban business hub, and is considered attractive due to its safety, relatively large housing stock, and extensive connections to Boston.

== History ==
=== Pre-Colonial Period to the Revolution ===
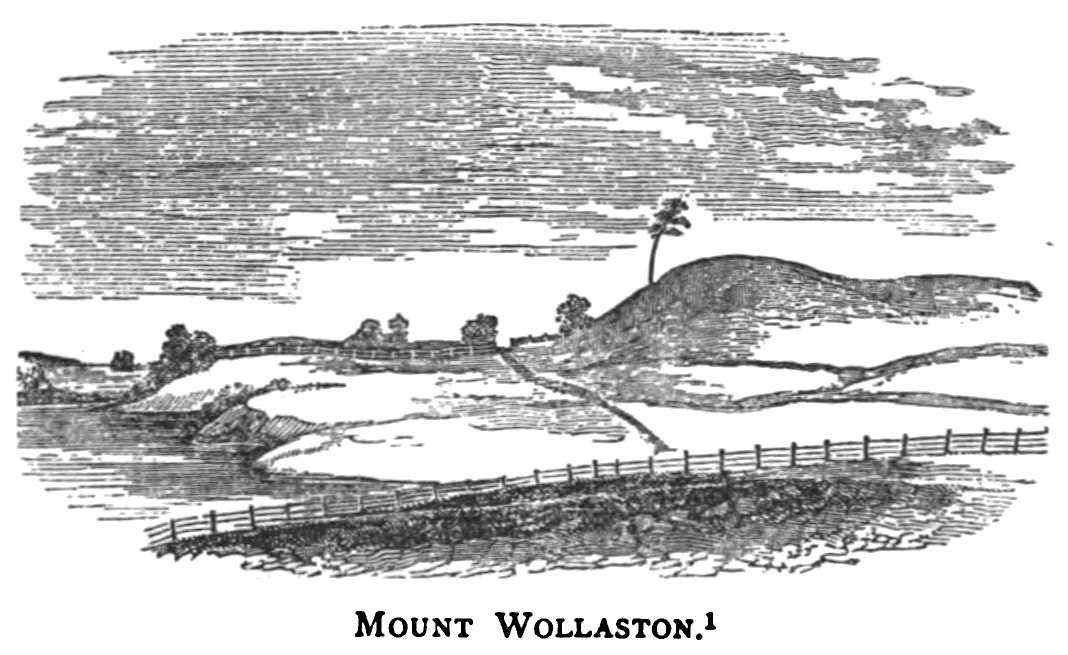
View of Mount Wollaston as it appeared in 1840, virtually unchanged from the time of initial English settlement in 1625. The central part of this sketch was adopted as the seal of Quincy.

The road that eventually became the Old Coast Road from Boston to Plymouth, going through Quincy and Braintree, started out as a Native American trail.

Massachusett Sachem Chickatawbut had his seat on a hill called Moswetuset Hummock prior to the settlement of the area by English colonists, situated east of the mouth of the Neponset River near what is now called Squantum. It was visited in 1621 by Plymouth Colony commander Myles Standish and Squanto, a native guide.

Four years later, a party led by Captain Richard Wollaston established a post on a low hill near the south shore of Quincy Bay east of present-day Black's Creek. The settlers found the area suitable for farming, as Chickatawbut and his group had cleared much of the land of trees. (The Indians used the name Passonagessit ("Little Neck of Land") for the area.) This settlement was named Mount Wollaston in honor of the leader, who left the area soon after 1625, bound for Virginia.

The Wollaston neighborhood in Quincy still retains Captain Wollaston's name. Upon the departure of Wollaston, Thomas Morton took over leadership of the post. Morton's history of conflict with the Plymouth settlement and his free-thinking ideals antagonized the Plymouth settlement, who maligned the colony and accused it of debauchery with Indian women and drunkenness. Morton renamed the settlement Ma-re-Mount ("Hill by the Sea") and later wrote that the conservative separatists of Plymouth Colony to the south were "threatening to make it a woefull mount and not a merry mount", in reference to the fact that they disapproved of his libertine practices. In 1627, Morton was arrested by Standish for violating the code of conduct in a way harmful to the colony. He was sent back to England, only to return and be arrested by Puritans the next year. The area of Quincy now called Merrymount is located on the site of the original English settlement of 1625 and takes its name from the punning name given by Morton.

The area was first incorporated as part of Dorchester in 1630; it was briefly annexed by Boston in 1634. The area became Braintree in 1640, bordered along the coast of Massachusetts Bay by Dorchester to the north and Weymouth to the east. Beginning in 1708, the modern border of Quincy first took shape as the North Precinct of Braintree.

=== Post-Revolution ===
Following the American Revolution, in 1792, Quincy was officially incorporated as a separate town from Braintree, named for Col. John Quincy, the grandfather of Abigail Adams. It was made a city in 1888. Quincy, Massachusetts, is the only one of the 17 U.S. cities named "Quincy" whose residents pronounce the name as "KWIN-zee" rather than "KWIN-see". In 1845, the Old Colony Railroad opened; the Massachusetts Historical Commission stated that the railroad was "the beginning of a trend toward suburbanization." Quincy became as accessible to Boston as was Charlestown. The first suburban land company, Bellevue Land Co., had been organized in northern Quincy in 1870. Quincy's population grew by over 50 percent during the 1920s.

Among the city's several firsts was the Granite Railway, the first commercial railroad in the United States. It was constructed in 1826 to carry granite from a Quincy quarry to the Neponset River in Milton so that the stone could then be taken by boat to erect the Bunker Hill Monument in Charlestown. Quincy granite became famous throughout the nation, and stonecutting became the city's principal economic activity. Quincy was also home to the first iron furnace in the United States, the John Winthrop Jr. Iron Furnace Site (also known as Braintree Furnace), from 1644 to 1653.

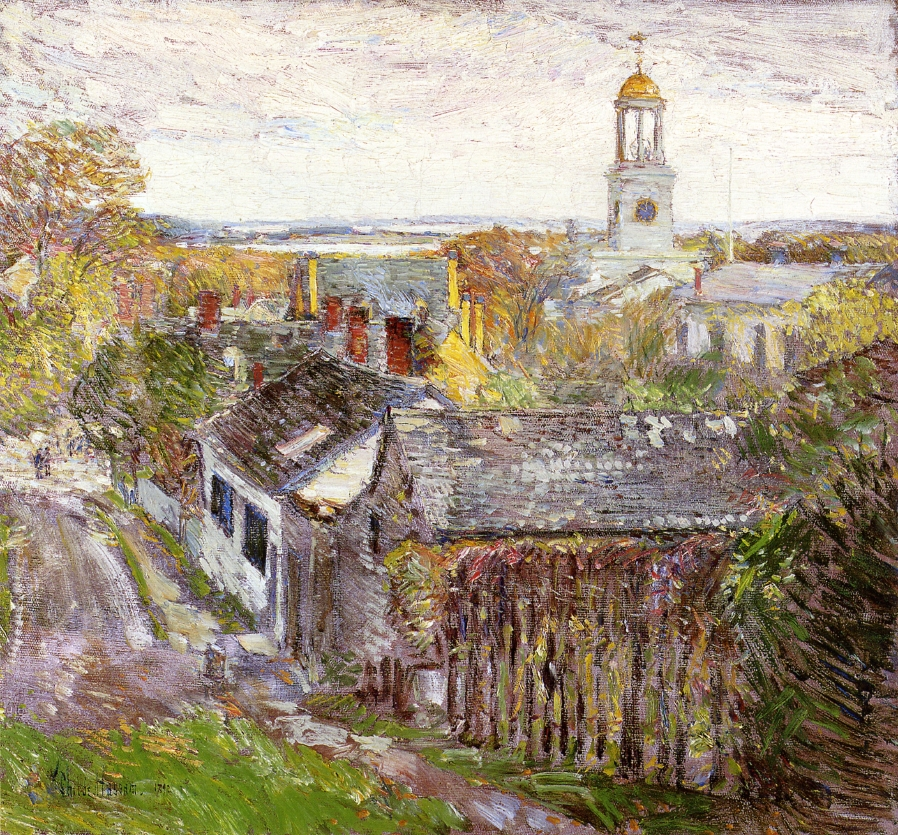
Quincy, Massachusetts, oil on canvas, Childe Hassam, 1892

In the 1870s, the city gave its name to the Quincy Method, an influential approach to education developed by Francis W. Parker while he served as Quincy's superintendent of schools. Parker, an early proponent of progressive education, put his ideas into practice in the city's underperforming schools; four years later, a state survey found that Quincy's students were excelling. Many of Quincy's teachers were recruited by districts in other states, spreading the Quincy method beyond Massachusetts to New Jersey, New York, Connecticut, Vermont, Florida, Minnesota, and other places.

Quincy was important as a shipbuilding center. Sailing ships were built in Quincy for many years, including the only seven-masted schooner ever built, Thomas W. Lawson. The Fore River area became a shipbuilding center in the 1880s. Founded by Thomas A. Watson, who became wealthy as assistant to Alexander Graham Bell in developing the telephone, many famous warships were built at the Fore River Shipyard. Amongst these were the aircraft carrier USS Lexington (CV-2); the battleships USS Massachusetts (BB-59), now preserved as a museum ship at Battleship Cove in Massachusetts, and USS Nevada (BB-36); and USS Salem (CA-139), the world's last all-gun heavy warship, which is still preserved at Fore River as the main exhibit of the United States Naval Shipbuilding Museum. James J. Kilroy, reputed originator of the famous Kilroy was here graffiti, was a rivet inspector at the Fore River Shipyard.

Quincy was also an aviation pioneer thanks to Dennison Field. Located in Squantum, it was one of the world's first airports and was partially developed by Amelia Earhart. In 1910, it was the site of the Harvard Aero Meet, the second air show in America. It was later leased to the Navy for an airfield, and served as a reserve Squantum Naval Air Station into the 1950s. The Army has also long maintained a presence in the city, with the Massachusetts Army National Guard occupying the Kelley Armory in Wollaston; from 1971 to 1976 it served as headquarters for the 187th Infantry Brigade.

The Howard Johnson's and Dunkin' Donuts restaurant chains were both founded in Quincy. Celtic punk band Dropkick Murphys got its start in the city's Wollaston neighborhood in 1996. Quincy is also home to the United States' longest-running Flag Day parade, a tradition that began in 1952 under Richard Koch, a former director of City Parks and Recreation, who started the "Koch Club" sports organization for kids and held an annual parade with flags.

== Geography ==
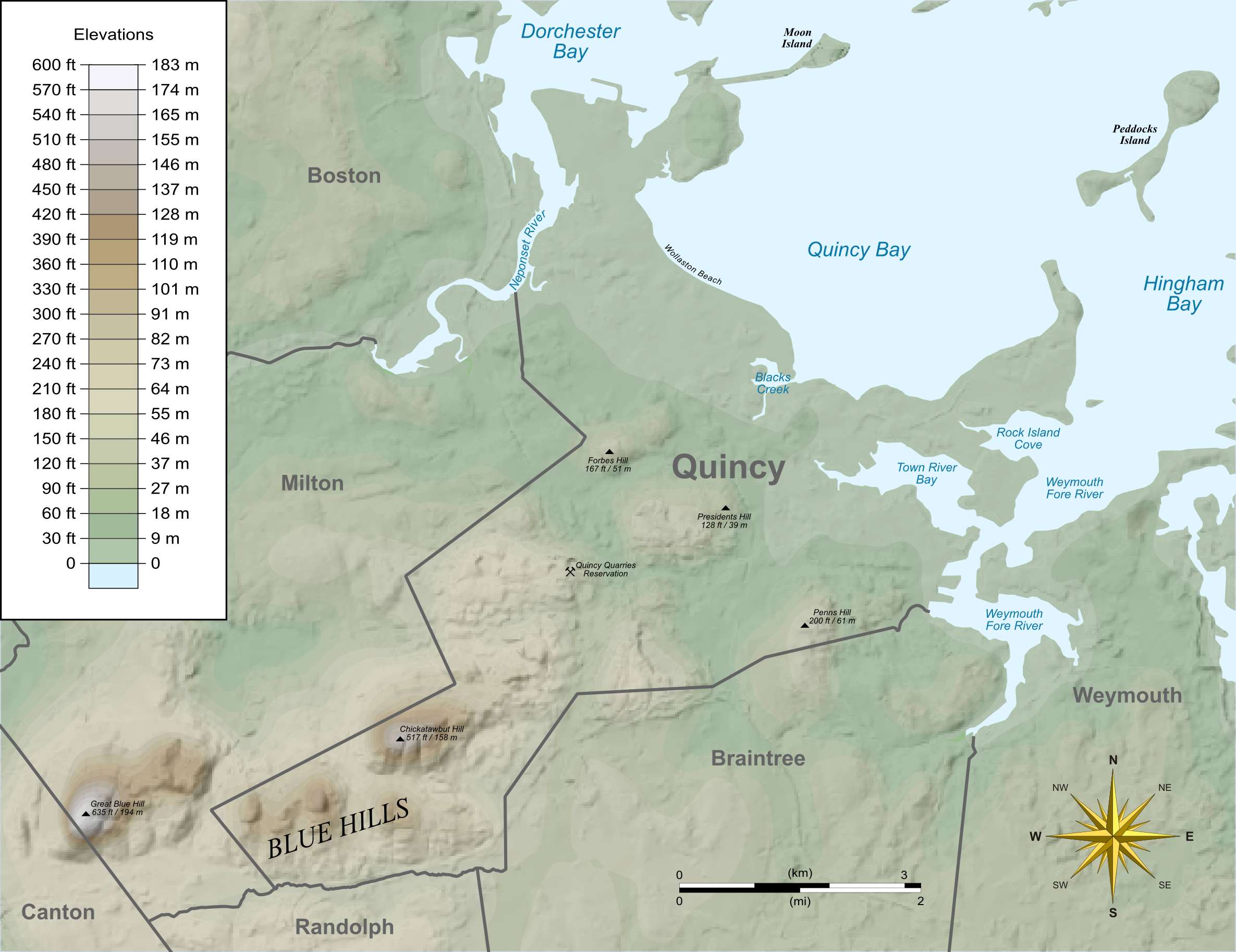
Quincy and surrounding area showing elevations and features

Quincy shares borders with Boston to the north (separated by the Neponset River), Milton to the west, Randolph and Braintree to the south, and Weymouth (separated by the Fore River) and Hull (maritime border between Quincy Bay and Hingham Bay) to the east. Historically, before incorporation when it was called "Mount Wollaston" and later as the "North Precinct" of Braintree, Quincy roughly began at the Neponset River in the north and ended at the Fore River in the south.

Quincy Bay, within city limits to the northeast, is part of Boston Harbor and Massachusetts Bay. There are several beaches in Quincy, including Wollaston Beach along Quincy Shore Drive. Located on the western shore of Quincy Bay, Wollaston Beach is the largest Boston Harbor beach. Quincy's territory includes Hangman Island, Moon Island (restricted access, and all land is owned by the City of Boston), Nut Island (now a peninsula), and Raccoon Island in the Boston Harbor Islands National Recreation Area.

According to the United States Census Bureau, the city has a total area of 26.9 square miles (70 km^{2}), of which 16.8 square miles (44 km^{2}) is land and 10.1 square miles (26 km^{2}) is water. The total area is 37.60% water.

Although Quincy is primarily urban, 2,485 acres (3.9 sq mi; 10.1 km^{2}; 1,005.6 ha) or fully 23 percent of its land area lies within the uninhabited Blue Hills Reservation, a state park managed by the Massachusetts Department of Conservation and Recreation. This undeveloped natural area encompasses the southwestern portion of Quincy and includes the city's highest point, 517-foot (158 m) Chickatawbut Hill. Other hills within Quincy include Forbes Hill in Wollaston, Presidents Hill in Quincy Center and Penns Hill in South Quincy.

=== Climate ===
Climate data for Blue Hills Reservation (Blue Hill Meteorological Observatory), 1991−2020 normals, extremes 1893−present
| Month | Jan | Feb | Mar | Apr | May | Jun | Jul | Aug | Sep | Oct | Nov | Dec | Year |
|---|---|---|---|---|---|---|---|---|---|---|---|---|---|
| Record high °F (°C) | 68 (20) | 71 (22) | 89 (32) | 94 (34) | 96 (36) | 99 (37) | 100 (38) | 101 (38) | 99 (37) | 88 (31) | 81 (27) | 74 (23) | 101 (38) |
| Mean maximum °F (°C) | 56.6 (13.7) | 56.9 (13.8) | 65.6 (18.7) | 79.4 (26.3) | 87.3 (30.7) | 90.0 (32.2) | 92.9 (33.8) | 91.3 (32.9) | 86.9 (30.5) | 77.6 (25.3) | 68.4 (20.2) | 60.0 (15.6) | 94.7 (34.8) |
| Mean daily maximum °F (°C) | 34.7 (1.5) | 37.0 (2.8) | 44.1 (6.7) | 56.3 (13.5) | 66.8 (19.3) | 75.4 (24.1) | 81.7 (27.6) | 80.2 (26.8) | 72.7 (22.6) | 61.0 (16.1) | 50.1 (10.1) | 40.2 (4.6) | 58.4 (14.6) |
| Daily mean °F (°C) | 26.5 (−3.1) | 28.2 (−2.1) | 35.5 (1.9) | 47.1 (8.4) | 58.5 (14.7) | 66.5 (19.2) | 72.7 (22.6) | 71.4 (21.9) | 64.2 (17.9) | 52.5 (11.4) | 42.0 (5.6) | 32.5 (0.3) | 49.8 (9.9) |
| Mean daily minimum °F (°C) | 18.3 (−7.6) | 19.5 (−6.9) | 26.9 (−2.8) | 37.9 (3.3) | 48.2 (9.0) | 57.6 (14.2) | 63.8 (17.7) | 62.6 (17.0) | 55.6 (13.1) | 44.0 (6.7) | 33.8 (1.0) | 24.9 (−3.9) | 41.1 (5.1) |
| Mean minimum °F (°C) | 0.0 (−17.8) | 3.1 (−16.1) | 10.1 (−12.2) | 26.7 (−2.9) | 37.5 (3.1) | 45.9 (7.7) | 54.9 (12.7) | 53.4 (11.9) | 42.3 (5.7) | 30.5 (−0.8) | 19.6 (−6.9) | 8.7 (−12.9) | −2.5 (−19.2) |
| Record low °F (°C) | −14 (−26) | −21 (−29) | −5 (−21) | 6 (−14) | 27 (−3) | 36 (2) | 44 (7) | 39 (4) | 28 (−2) | 21 (−6) | 5 (−15) | −19 (−28) | −21 (−29) |
| Average precipitation inches (mm) | 4.50 (114) | 4.00 (102) | 5.52 (140) | 4.76 (121) | 3.82 (97) | 4.63 (118) | 3.47 (88) | 3.91 (99) | 4.06 (103) | 5.49 (139) | 4.31 (109) | 5.39 (137) | 53.86 (1,367) |
| Average snowfall inches (cm) | 18.6 (47) | 18.2 (46) | 15.0 (38) | 2.8 (7.1) | 0.0 (0.0) | 0.0 (0.0) | 0.0 (0.0) | 0.0 (0.0) | 0.0 (0.0) | 0.7 (1.8) | 1.8 (4.6) | 12.6 (32) | 69.7 (176.5) |
| Average extreme snow depth inches (cm) | 10.6 (27) | 11.5 (29) | 9.8 (25) | 2.6 (6.6) | 0.0 (0.0) | 0.0 (0.0) | 0.0 (0.0) | 0.0 (0.0) | 0.0 (0.0) | 0.3 (0.76) | 1.3 (3.3) | 7.7 (20) | 17.1 (43) |
| Average precipitation days (≥ 0.01 in) | 13.2 | 11.3 | 12.5 | 12.5 | 13.0 | 12.1 | 10.5 | 10.2 | 9.2 | 11.5 | 10.9 | 12.6 | 139.5 |
| Average snowy days (≥ 0.1 in) | 8.1 | 7.1 | 5.7 | 1.3 | 0.0 | 0.0 | 0.0 | 0.0 | 0.0 | 0.4 | 1.3 | 5.3 | 29.2 |
| Mean monthly sunshine hours | 132.1 | 146.7 | 174.0 | 185.6 | 220.2 | 231.8 | 258.1 | 242.5 | 204.1 | 182.1 | 133.3 | 125.9 | 2,236.4 |
| Percentage possible sunshine | 46.3 | 50.9 | 48.5 | 47.9 | 50.4 | 52.7 | 58.0 | 58.7 | 56.7 | 55.1 | 47.0 | 45.9 | 51.5 |
Source 1: NOAA
Source 2: BHO

== Demographics ==
Historical population
| Year | Pop. | ±% |
|---|---|---|
| 1800 | 1,081 | — |
| 1810 | 1,281 | +18.5% |
| 1820 | 1,628 | +27.1% |
| 1830 | 2,201 | +35.2% |
| 1840 | 3,486 | +58.4% |
| 1850 | 5,017 | +43.9% |
| 1860 | 6,778 | +35.1% |
| 1870 | 7,442 | +9.8% |
| 1880 | 10,570 | +42.0% |
| 1890 | 16,723 | +58.2% |
| 1900 | 23,899 | +42.9% |
| 1910 | 32,642 | +36.6% |
| 1920 | 47,876 | +46.7% |
| 1930 | 71,983 | +50.4% |
| 1940 | 75,810 | +5.3% |
| 1950 | 83,835 | +10.6% |
| 1960 | 87,409 | +4.3% |
| 1970 | 87,966 | +0.6% |
| 1980 | 84,743 | −3.7% |
| 1990 | 84,985 | +0.3% |
| 2000 | 88,025 | +3.6% |
| 2010 | 92,271 | +4.8% |
| 2020 | 101,636 | +10.1% |
| 2024* | 103,434 | +1.8% |
* = population estimate. Source: United States census records and Population Estimates Program data. Source: U.S. Decennial Census

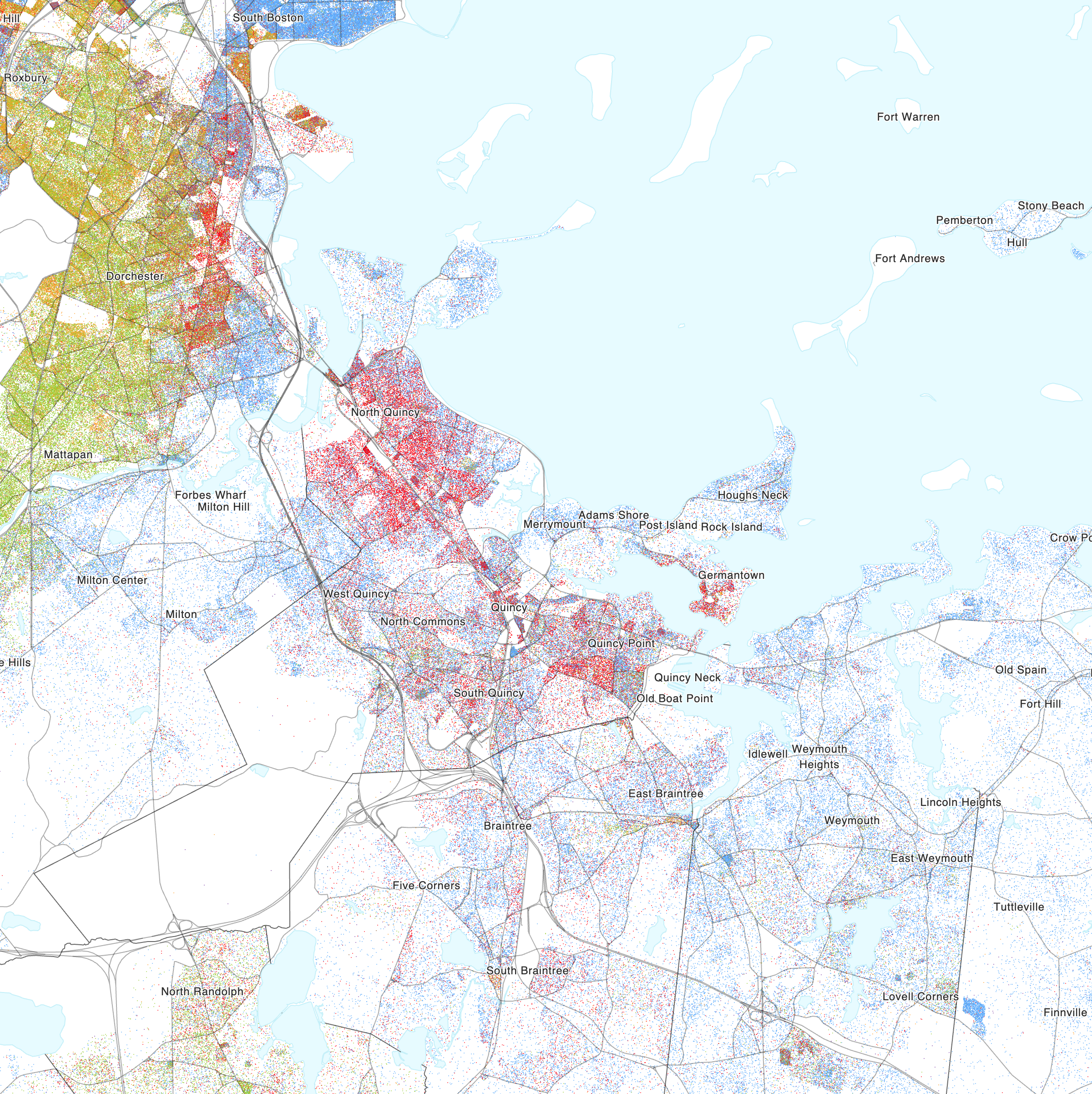
Map of racial distribution in Quincy, 2020 U.S. census. Each dot is one person: ⬤ White ⬤ Black ⬤ Asian ⬤ Hispanic ⬤ Multiracial ⬤ Native American/Other

=== 2020 census ===
Quincy, Massachusetts – Racial and ethnic composition Note: the US Census treats Hispanic/Latino as an ethnic category. This table excludes Latinos from the racial categories and assigns them to a separate category. Hispanics/Latinos may be of any race.
| Race / Ethnicity (NH = Non-Hispanic) | Pop 2000 | Pop 2010 | Pop 2020 | % 2000 | % 2010 | % 2020 |
|---|---|---|---|---|---|---|
| White alone (NH) | 68,980 | 60,448 | 55,055 | 78.36% | 65.51% | 54.17% |
| Black or African American alone (NH) | 1,846 | 3,998 | 5,449 | 2.10% | 4.33% | 5.36% |
| Native American or Alaska Native alone (NH) | 129 | 137 | 117 | 0.15% | 0.15% | 0.12% |
| Asian alone (NH) | 13,519 | 22,124 | 31,196 | 15.36% | 23.98% | 30.69% |
| Pacific Islander alone (NH) | 19 | 21 | 16 | 0.02% | 0.02% | 0.02% |
| Some Other Race alone (NH) | 290 | 768 | 1,011 | 0.33% | 0.83% | 0.99% |
| Mixed Race or Multi-Racial (NH) | 1,407 | 1,686 | 3,578 | 1.60% | 1.83% | 3.52% |
| Hispanic or Latino (any race) | 1,835 | 3,089 | 5,214 | 2.08% | 3.35% | 5.13% |
| Total | 88,025 | 92,271 | 101,636 | 100.00% | 100.00% | 100.00% |

As of the 2020 United States census, there were 101,636 people and 46,789 households, making it the eighth-largest city in the state. The population density was 6,137.6 inhabitants per square mile (2,369.7/km^{2}). There were 51,156 housing units.

The racial makeup of the city was 56.2% White (non-Hispanic), 6.4% African American alone, 0.1% Native American alone, 28.9% Asian alone (15.6% Chinese, 3.2% Vietnamese, 2.6% Indian), 0.1% Native Hawaiian or Pacific Islander, 0.85% from other races, and 5.3% from two or more races. Hispanic or Latino of any race were 5.4% of the population. 33.5% were of Irish, 12.7% Italian and 5.0% English ancestry according to the 2000 Census. 58.1% spoke only English, while 8.0% spoke Chinese or Mandarin, 2.6% Cantonese, 1.9% Spanish, 1.5% Vietnamese and 1.3% Italian in their homes.

Of the city's 46,789 households, approximately 56.6% were married couples living together, 12.5% had a female householder with no spouse present, 5.2% were male householders with no spouse present, and 25.8% were non-families. 50.1% of Quincy's population was male, and 49.9% female. The average household size was 2.2 people, and most people (84.3%) were in the same house a year ago.

In the city, the age distribution of the population shows 14% under the age of 18, 66.2% from 18 to 64, and 19.9% who were 65 years of age or older. The median age was 40.8 years.

Age Distribution
| Age | Percent | Total |
|---|---|---|
| 0–9 | 8.4% | 8,577 |
| 10–19 | 8.9% | 9,067 |
| 20–29 | 13% | 13,209 |
| 30–39 | 18.4% | 18,727 |
| 40–49 | 13.1% | 13,355 |
| 50–59 | 9.9% | 10,110 |
| 60–69 | 16% | 16,240 |
| 70–79 | 7.6% | 7,775 |
| 80+ | 4.6% | 4,656 |

The median income for a household in the city was $90,668. Males had a median income of 1.31 times greater than females ($97,905 compared to $74,737 for females). The per capita income for the city was $53,082. About 7.3% of families and 9.8% of the population were below the poverty line, including 15.2% of those under age 18 and 11.1% of those age 65 or over.

=== Asian community ===
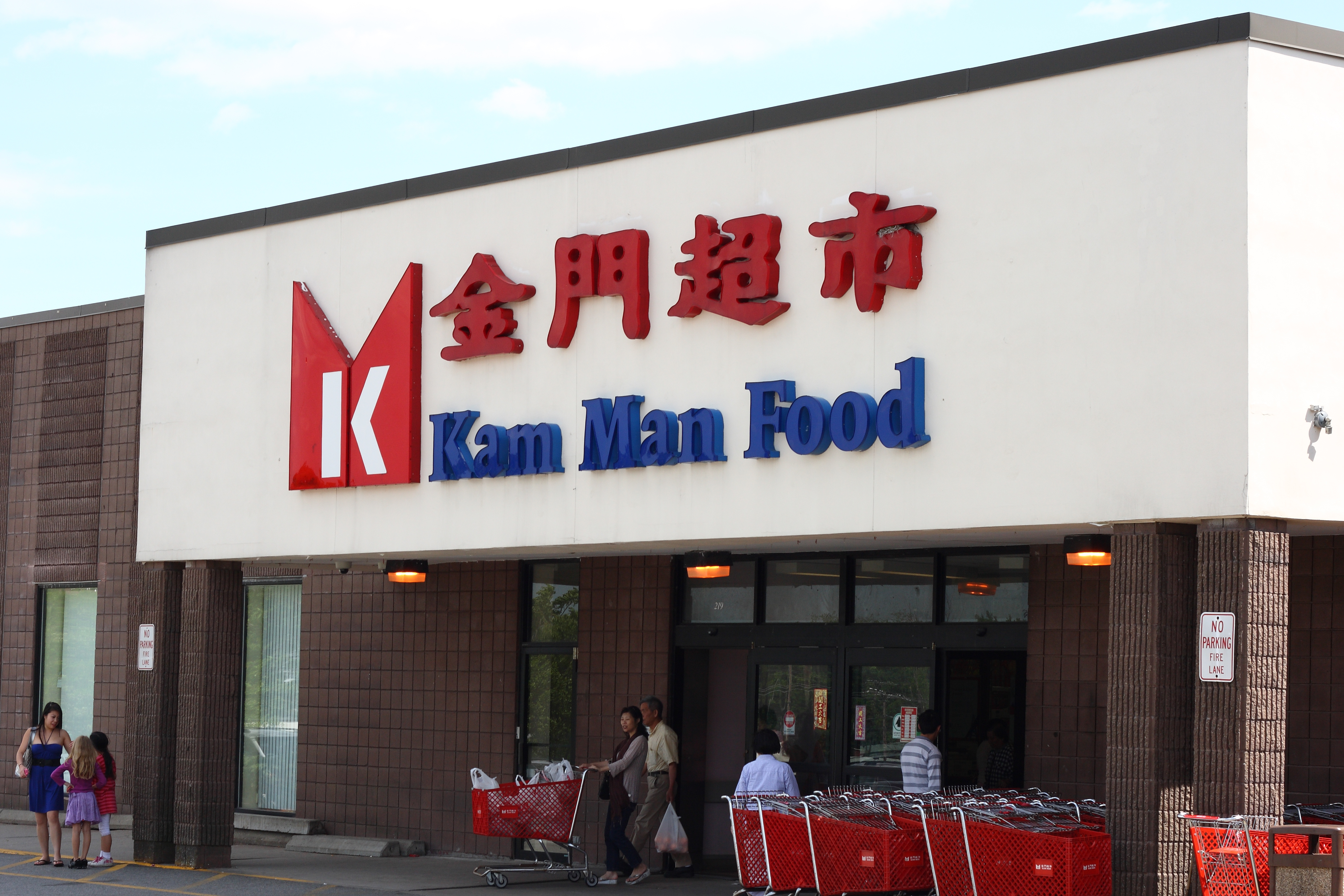
Kam Man Food in Quincy

As of 2010, Quincy has the highest per capita concentration of persons of Asian origin in Massachusetts. As of 2003 about 66% of the Asians in Quincy are ethnic Chinese, giving the city one of the largest Chinese populations in the state. There is also a community of persons of East Indian origins, with most of them working in information technology and other skilled professions. A growing number of people with Vietnamese origins live in the area as well and make up the second largest Asian American group in Quincy; it is estimated that nearly 4,000 Vietnamese people live in the city.

In 1980, there were 750 persons of Asian origin in Quincy. Most of the Asian immigrants coming in the 1980s originated from Hong Kong and Taiwan. In 1990, Quincy had 5,577 persons of Asian origin, with 143 of them being of East Indian origin. The number of Asians increased to 13,546 in 2000, with about 9,000 of them being ethnic Chinese, and 1,127 of them being ethnic East Indian. The latter group grew by 688%, making it the fastest-growing Asian subgroup in Quincy. Around 2003, most Asian immigrants were coming from Fujian instead of Hong Kong and Taiwan. At that time, Quincy had a higher Asian population than the Boston Chinatown. The overall Asian population increased by 64% in the following decade, to 22,174 in 2010. Quincy's Chinese population increased by 60% during that time period.

Historically, Quincy's Asian residents traveled to shops in Chinatown, Boston. In 2003, New York City-based Kam Man Food opened one of its supermarkets in Quincy. In February 2017, City Councilor Nina Liang presented a motion to designate Quincy as a "Sanctuary City". This motion was voted down by the City Council. Quincy has an estimated 8,000 undocumented residents and has the 11th-highest concentration of immigrants in Massachusetts overall.

As of 2000, about 50% of Asians in Quincy own their own houses; many who rent do so while saving money for down payments for their houses. Sixty-five percent of the Chinese were homeowners, while only 10% of the East Indians were homeowners. As of 2003, slightly more than 2,500 Asian Americans in Quincy were registered to vote, making up almost 25% of Asians in the city who were eligible to vote.

In the 1980s, the city experienced unrest due to racial tensions and violence directed toward Southeast Asian and Chinese residents. At this time, the Quincy Police Department did not employ any AAPI police officers, which led to a lack of trust within the Asian-American community. The City gradually increased its outreach to its Asian-American communities and developed multicultural programming showcasing immigrant cultures to help familiarize the larger community with its new neighbors and promote community integration. Racial tensions gradually diminished, and by 2003, the Quincy Police Department had prioritized the diversification of their force, employing multiple Asian-American officers .

In 2003, Quincy Asian Resources Inc. planned to establish a newsletter for Asian residents. In 2011, Boston Chinatown Neighborhood Center, Inc. (BCNC; 波士頓華埠社區中心) began offering services in Quincy.

== Neighborhoods ==
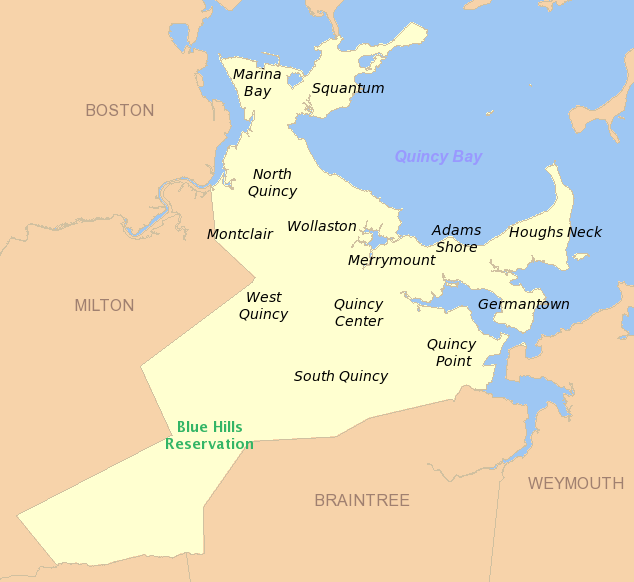
Map of Quincy neighborhoods

Quincy is divided into numerous neighborhoods with individual histories and characteristics.

- Adams Shore was originally developed as a summer resort location and is now a year-round residential area.
- Germantown is the site of a former planned manufacturing community begun in the 1750s to encourage German immigration, it is now a densely populated residential neighborhood featuring several public housing developments.
- Houghs Neck is a northeastern peninsular community named for Atherton Hough, who was granted the land in 1636 for use as a farm and orchard. Hough's Neck has a substantial Irish-American population.
- Marina Bay is a residential-commercial area developed in the 1980s on the site of the closed Naval Air Station Squantum with high-rise condominiums, restaurants and a large marina.
- Merrymount is a primarily residential neighborhood and the site of Quincy's initial settlement.
- Montclair is the northwestern section of the city along West Squantum Street, bordering the town of Milton.
- North Quincy is a residential and commercial neighborhood along Hancock Street and Quincy Shore Drive that is home to a substantial Asian-American population, the community is regionally notable for its culturally diverse small business sector, and it is the location of the city's largest high school, North Quincy High School.
- Quincy Center is a historic commercial and government center of the city where City Hall, Thomas Crane Public Library, the United First Parish Church (Old Stone Church), Quincy Masonic Building, The Adams Academy building, The Woodward School for Girls, and numerous office buildings and residential streets can be found.
- Quincy Point is a densely populated residential area east of Quincy Center, with commercial areas along Quincy Avenue and Southern Artery, it is also the site of the Fore River Shipyard.
- South Quincy is a residential and commercial area bordering the town of Braintree that includes Crown Colony office park and Faxon Park, a wooded 66-acre (0.27 km^{2}) protected space.
- Squantum is a peninsular area and the northernmost region of Quincy, once-popular as a summer seaside resort destination, it is now a year-round residential area known for its tight-knit community and its recreational offerings, including several municipal beaches and Squantum Point Park, which is on the site of the former Naval Air Station Squantum. Squantum has a significant Irish-American population.
- West Quincy is a residential and commercial section with immediate access to Interstate 93 and is the site of several former granite quarries, now the Quincy Quarries Reservation, as well as the Granite Railway, the first commercial railway in the United States.
- Wollaston, named for Captain Richard Wollaston, the leader of Quincy's original settlers, was an early rail-accessed commuter home for Boston workers, it is now a densely populated residential and commercial area that includes the former Eastern Nazarene College campus.

== Economy ==
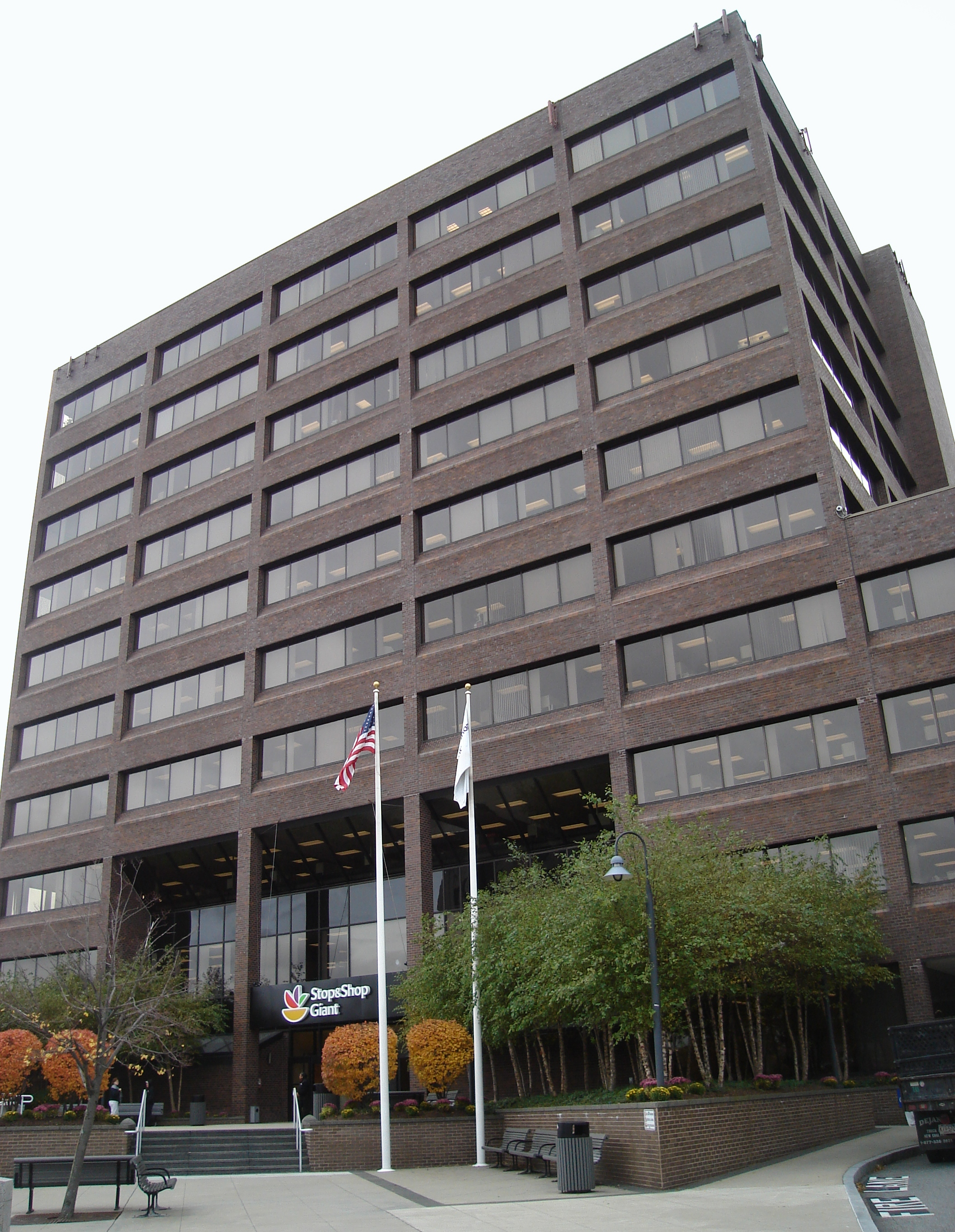
Headquarters building of Stop & Shop supermarket chain in Quincy Center

During its history, Quincy has been known as a manufacturing and heavy industry center, with granite quarrying dominating employment in the 19th century and shipbuilding at the Fore River Shipyard and Squantum Victory Yard rising to prominence in the 20th century. The recent decades have seen a shift in focus to several large employers in the professional and service sector of the economy. Quincy is the location of the corporate headquarters of several firms, including Boston Financial Data Services, the Stop & Shop supermarket chain, Arbella Insurance Group and The Patriot Ledger, the publisher of the South Shore's largest regional newspaper.

Other major employers with offices in Quincy are State Street Corporation, Blue Cross Blue Shield of Massachusetts, Harvard Pilgrim Health Care and Boston Scientific. TACV, national flag carrier airline of Cape Verde, has its United States corporate office in Quincy. Icelandair has its North American headquarters in the city as well.

=== Income ===
Data is from the 2009–2013 American Community Survey 5-Year Estimates.

| Rank | ZIP Code (ZCTA) | Per capita income | Median household income | Median family income | Population | Number of households |
|---|---|---|---|---|---|---|
| | Norfolk County | $44,692 | $84,916 | $108,943 | 677,296 | 257,451 |
| 1 | 02171 | $36,933 | $64,812 | $81,455 | 17,735 | 7,551 |
| | Massachusetts | $35,763 | $66,866 | $84,900 | 6,605,058 | 2,530,147 |
| | Quincy | $33,131 | $61,328 | $74,544 | 92,595 | 39,778 |
| 2 | 02169 | $32,613 | $58,669 | $73,743 | 55,064 | 24,466 |
| 3 | 02170 | $31,165 | $66,917 | $73,971 | 19,796 | 7,761 |
| | United States | $28,155 | $53,046 | $64,719 | 311,536,594 | 115,610,216 |

== Government ==
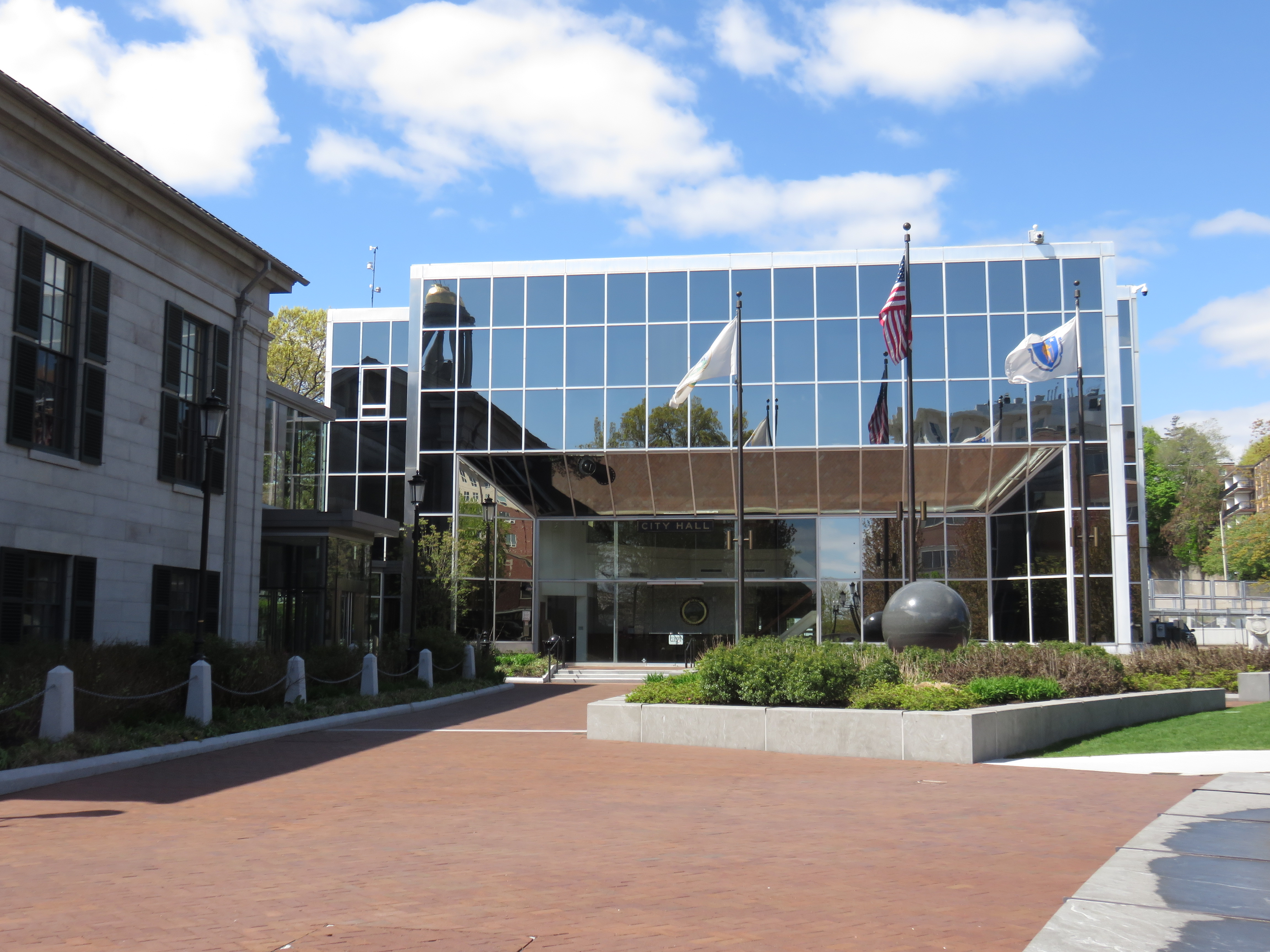
Quincy City Hall in 2019

=== Local ===
Quincy has a strong mayor government. The incumbent mayor, Thomas P. Koch, has served since 2008; he is the 33rd mayor of the city. Mayors in the city were elected to two-year terms. In 2013, the city's voters opted to extend the mayoral term to four years, beginning after the 2015 election.

In addition to the mayor, the city has a nine-member city council, with Anne Mahoney serving as president as of 2026. One councilor is elected to represent each of the city's six wards, and three are elected at large. Councilors serve two-year terms. The city also has a school committee with seven members—the mayor and six members elected to staggered four-year terms.

==== Public safety ====
The Quincy Police Department was formed in 1888, currently headquartered at the original Quincy Police Station which was built in 1925 as the city's first purpose-built police station and added to the National Register of Historic Places in 1990. In 2010, the city of Quincy was the first in the US to have its police department carry the nasal spray Narcan (Nalaxone) to combat the overdose outbreak associated with the opioid epidemic in the US. When the program first began, the city's officers were reviving an overdose victim every four to five days. By 2014, police officers had administered the opioid antagonist over 300 times. Other cities and police departments throughout the US developed their own Narcan-dispensing programs based on the model pioneered by the Quincy PD. In 2017, overdose deaths in the city and the Commonwealth of Massachusetts had declined, it was thought, due to the use of naloxone by the police and others. The state legislature, in 2018, required all pharmacies to keep Narcan in stock and available to anyone, without a prescription.

Fire emergencies are handled by the Quincy Fire Department, which was founded in 1889 and includes the Central Fire Station, which is on the National Register of Historic Places and is still active as of 2023. The city's Emergency Medical Services are privately contracted, with ambulance response being handled by Brewster Ambulance Service since 2015.

=== State ===
Quincy is represented in the Massachusetts State Senate by Democrat John F. Keenan (Norfolk and Plymouth district). Three members of the Massachusetts House of Representatives represent Quincy: Bruce Ayers (1st Norfolk district), Tackey Chan (2nd Norfolk district), and Ronald Mariano (3rd Norfolk district). Each representative is a Democrat, and Mariano is the speaker of the House.

Voter registration and party enrollment as of October 26, 2024 – Quincy
| Party | Number of voters | Percentage |
|---|---|---|
| Democratic | 18,874 | 28.10% |
| Republican | 4,448 | 6.62% |
| Unenrolled | 43,149 | 64.24% |
| Political Designations | 202 | 0.30% |
| Total | 67,168 | 100% |

Presidential election results
| Year | Democratic | Republican |
|---|---|---|
| 2024 | 60.9% 25,651 | 36.1% 15,210 |
| 2020 | 66.5% 30,446 | 31.3% 14,340 |
| 2016 | 62.4% 25,477 | 32.6% 13,321 |
| 2012 | 61.4% 24,849 | 36.7% 14,850 |
| 2008 | 57.9% 22,810 | 39.5% 15,546 |
| 2004 | 63.6% 24,173 | 35.2% 13,373 |
| 2000 | 61.6% 23,117 | 30.0% 11,282 |
| 1996 | 63.5% 23,182 | 26.9% 9,824 |
| 1992 | 46.7% 18,891 | 30.4% 12,306 |
| 1988 | 52.4% 20,911 | 46.1% 18,403 |
| 1984 | 48.4% 18,971 | 51.3% 20,123 |
| 1980 | 42.9% 17,977 | 43.1% 18,038 |

== Education ==
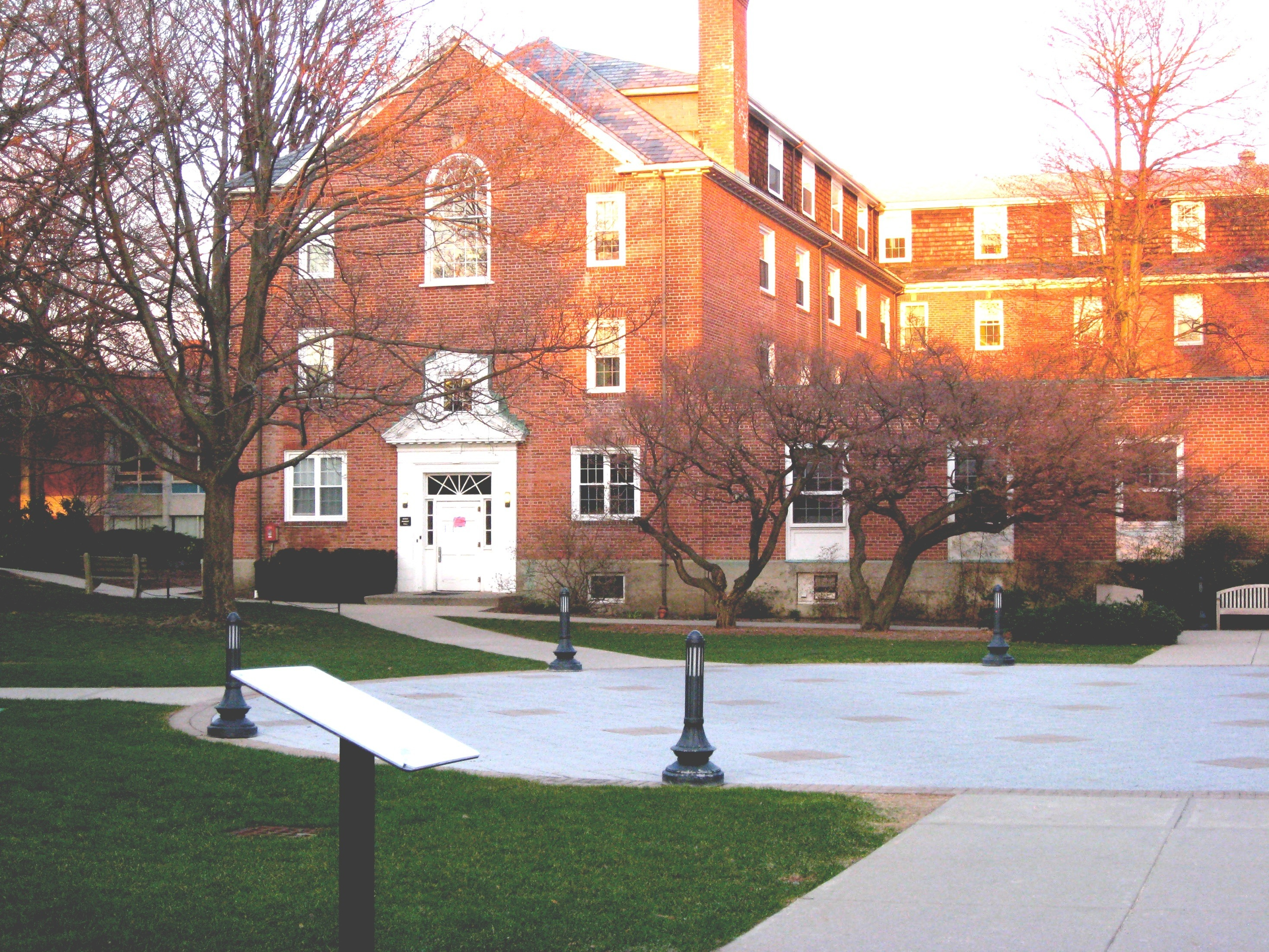
Munro Hall on the Eastern Nazarene College main campus

Quincy is home to various educational institutions, public and private, including a Montessori school, a Catholic academy, and one independent college-preparatory school. Eastern Nazarene College, a private liberal arts and sciences college that is currently in the process of closing after the 24–25 school year, and Quincy College, a public community college, two public high schools, five public middle schools, and 12 public elementary schools. In the 19th century, the city became an innovator in progressive public education with the Quincy Method, developed by Francis W. Parker while he served as Quincy's superintendent of schools. Four years after its implementation, a state survey found that Quincy students excelled at reading, writing, and spelling, and ranked fourth in their county in math.

=== Higher education ===
The city is home to Eastern Nazarene College, a former college of the liberal arts and sciences located in Wollaston Park. The college relocated to the area in 1919 from its original location in Saratoga Springs, New York, where it was established as a "holiness college" in 1900. In June 2024, The Board of Trustees of Eastern Nazarene College announced that the institution was preparing a plan to take steps toward closure, with the goal of closing the college at the end of the 2024–2025 school year. The future of its campus is uncertain as of November 2024.

Quincy College, a community college in Quincy Center, operates under the auspices of the City of Quincy. The college is unusual in this respect, as it is the only one of Massachusetts' 16 community colleges to be run by a city rather than by the state. It is one of only two colleges in the United States organized this way.

=== Public primary and secondary education ===
Public education at the primary and secondary levels is managed by Quincy Public Schools, a system that includes one early childhood center, eleven elementary schools, five middle schools and two high schools.

Public high schools

- North Quincy High School
- Quincy High School

Public middle schools

- Atlantic
- Broad Meadows
- Central
- Point Webster
- South-West (formerly Reay E. Sterling)

Public elementary schools

- Atherton Hough
- Beechwood Knoll
- Charles A. Bernazzani
- Clifford Marshall
- Lincoln-Hancock Community
- Merrymount
- Montclair
- Francis W. Parker
- Snug Harbor Community
- Squantum
- Wollaston
- Dr. Richard DeCristofaro Learning Center

=== Private and alternative education ===
Private and alternative education institutions for children in preschool through 8th grade include Quincy's three Catholic parochial schools—Sacred Heart, St. Ann, and St. Mary. The Archdiocese of Boston decided to merge these three schools to form the Quincy Catholic Academy, which opened in 2010 on the site of the former Sacred Heart school.

The Woodward School for Girls, opened in 1894, is an independent school offering a college-preparatory education to girls in grades 6–12.

The Adams Montessori School is open to children of preschool through elementary school age.

=== Public libraries ===
The Thomas Crane Public Library serves as the flagship library of the city's library network, which is part of the regional Old Colony Library Network.

=== Supplementary education ===
Several Chinese community organizations in Quincy have offered after-school and weekend instruction in Mandarin and Cantonese to local youth over the years. The Quincy Chinese Language School and The Chung Yee School are no longer in operation. In 2016, The South Shore Chinese Language School began offering popular weekend classes in Mandarin and Cantonese to children ages 5 and up at the Quincy YMCA.

== Transportation ==
City of Presidents banner previously displayed on Route 3A. The temporary Fore River Bridge can be seen in the background.

As part of Metro Boston, Quincy has easy access to transportation facilities. State highways and the Interstate system connect the Greater Boston area to the airport, port, and intermodal facilities of Boston. Due to its proximity to Boston proper, Quincy is connected not only by these modes of transportation but also to the regional subway system, operated by the Massachusetts Bay Transportation Authority (MBTA), known locally as "The T". The four subway or "T" stops in Quincy, which are on the MBTA's Red Line, are North Quincy Station, Wollaston Station, Quincy Center Station, and Quincy Adams Station.

=== Highways and roads ===
Interstate 93 and U.S. Route 1 travel south to north concurrently through Quincy beginning in the southwest, where the Quincy–Randolph border bisects the median between the northern and southern halves of the Exit 5 cloverleaf at Massachusetts Route 28. Following a route around the southern extent of the Blue Hills Reservation, this I-93 and US 1 alignment is along the former southern section of Route 128. The highway travels along a wooded wetland region of the Reservation, entering Quincy completely just beyond Exit 5 and then crossing into Braintree as it approaches the Braintree Split, the junction with Massachusetts Route 3. Weekday traffic volume averages 250,000 to 275,000 vehicles per day at this intersection, the gateway from Boston and its inner core to the South Shore and Cape Cod.

As Route 3 joins I-93 and US 1 at the Braintree Split, the three travel north together toward Boston around the eastern extent of the Blue Hills Reservation, entering West Quincy as the Southeast Expressway. The expressway provides access to West Quincy at Exit 8—Furnace Brook Parkway and Exit 9—Bryant Avenue/Adams Street before entering Milton. The Furnace Brook Parkway exit also provides access to Ricciuti Drive and the Quincy Quarries Reservation as well as the eastern entrance to the Blue Hills Reservation Parkways.

Principal numbered state highways traveling within Quincy include: Route 3A south to north from Weymouth via Washington Street, Southern Artery, Merrymount Parkway and Hancock Street to the Neponset River Bridge and the Dorchester section of Boston; Route 28, which travels south to north from Randolph to Milton along Randolph Avenue in Quincy through a remote section of the Blue Hills Reservation; and Route 53, which enters traveling south to north from Braintree as Quincy Avenue, turning right to form the beginning of Southern Artery in Quincy Point before ending at the intersection with Washington Street/Route 3A.

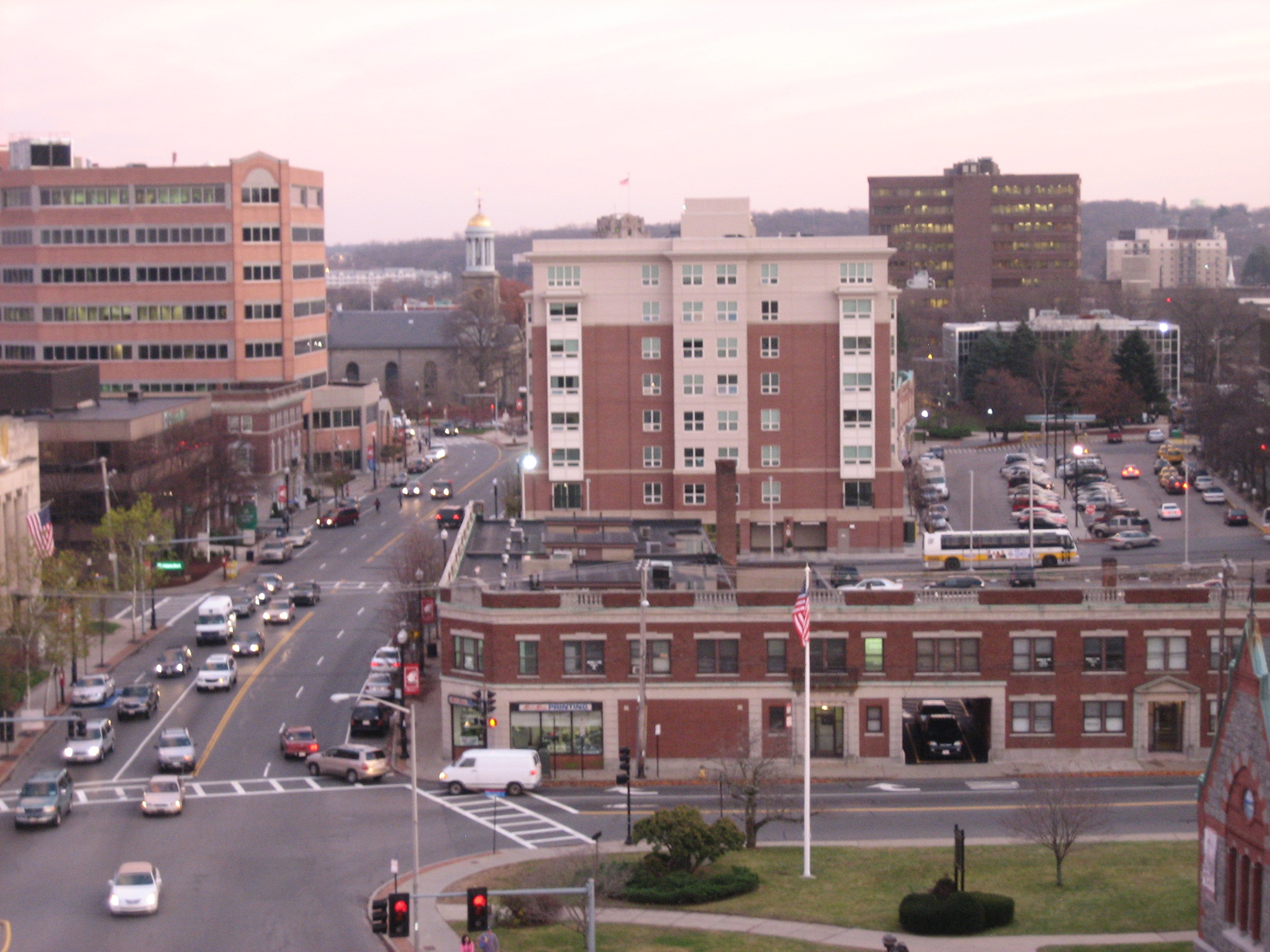
Quincy Center as seen from the intersection of Adams Street and Hancock Street

In addition to the Blue Hills parkways, Quincy includes two other Massachusetts Department of Conservation and Recreation parkways. Furnace Brook Parkway travels east from I-93 through the center of the city from West Quincy to Quincy Center and Merrymount at Quincy Bay. There the parkway meets Quincy Shore Drive at the mouth of Blacks Creek. Quincy Shore Drive travels in a northerly direction along the shore of Quincy Bay through Wollaston and into North Quincy, with much of its length abutting Wollaston Beach, then turns in a westerly direction upon intersecting with East Squantum Street and continues to meet Hancock Street at the Neponset River Bridge.

As for Quincy's other important city streets, Hancock Street begins at the southern extent of Quincy Center as a continuation of Quincy Avenue and travels north to Dorchester as a main commercial thoroughfare of Quincy Center, Wollaston and North Quincy. Washington Street enters the city at Fore River Rotary after crossing Weymouth Fore River via the Fore River Bridge and continues to Quincy Center, ending at Hancock Street. Along with Quincy Avenue and Southern Artery, other heavily traveled streets include Newport Avenue, which parallels Hancock Street to the west on the opposite side of the MBTA railway, Adams Street heading west from Quincy Center to Milton, and West and East Squantum Streets in the Montclair and North Quincy neighborhoods. Other streets are discussed in several of the neighborhood articles listed above.

=== Airport ===
Boston's Logan International Airport is accessible via MBTA Red Line connections at South Station, directly on the MBTA commuter boat (see below) or by motor vehicle using Interstate 93 or surface roads to the Ted Williams Tunnel.

=== MBTA rail and other commuter services ===
Subway service is available on the Red Line of the MBTA from four stations in Quincy: North Quincy, Wollaston, Quincy Center, and Quincy Adams. Commuter rail service operates out of Quincy Center. Both services serve South Station in Boston with connections to MBTA Commuter Rail and Amtrak intercity lines. Buses are also available for transportation in Quincy, including private bus lines and several lines provided by the MBTA. Most of the MBTA routes funnel through the Quincy Center station, which is the principal hub south of Boston for all MBTA bus lines. The southern bus garage for the MBTA system is adjacent to the Quincy Armory on Hancock Street.

Fore River Shipyard in Quincy Point was formerly a terminal for the MBTA ferry system. Service ended in October 2013 after a water main break damaged the sea wall and wharf. Temporary repairs would have cost $15 million; permanent repairs $50 million. In 2014, the MBTA made the decision to permanently end the service and sell the land.

== Sports ==
Quincy has had brief flirtations with professional sports. The Quincy Chiefs of the minor league Eastern Basketball Association (the predecessor to the defunct Continental Basketball Association) played a single season in 1977–1978. Quincy's professional baseball team, the Shipbuilders, competed in the New England League in 1933, recording a 12–6 record before moving to Nashua midseason; a revival of the team played in the NEL from 1941 through to 1944. The final season of the Boston Minutemen of the North American Soccer League was played at Veterans Memorial Stadium, in 1976, finishing 7–17.

The Real Boston Rams of the soccer 4th division Premier Development League, an affiliate club of the New England Revolution, played in Veterans Memorial Stadium from 2014 to 2015.

In 2019, the Boston Cannons, a professional men's field lacrosse team in the Premier Lacrosse League (PLL) moved their home stadium from Boston to Veterans Memorial Stadium. The team played two seasons there before the MLL–PLL merger.

The New England Free Jacks of Major League Rugby moved to Veterans Memorial Stadium in 2021, relocating from Weymouth.

Quincy has had several football teams in the semi-pro Eastern Football League over the years. The current club, the Quincy Militia, played its inaugural season in the EFL in 2009. Founded in 2009 by long-time Quincy resident Vaughn Driscoll, new owners came into the team picture in 2013. Militia games are played July to October with home games at Veterans Memorial Stadium on Saturday nights. An earlier team, the Quincy Giants, played in the minor league Atlantic Coast Football League between 1969 and 1971.

Quincy's only college sports program was the "Lions" of Eastern Nazarene College, in the D-III Conference of New England of the National Collegiate Athletic Association (NCAA) and the Eastern College Athletic Conference (ECAC), before the closure of the college in June 2025.

Quincy's high school sports programs are in the Patriot League: the D-III Fisher Division "Raiders" of North Quincy High School and the DIIA Keenan Division "Presidents" of Quincy High School, who are rivals. Quincy also hosted the youth baseball Babe Ruth League World Series in 2003, 2005 and 2008. High school baseball and Babe Ruth League games are played at Adams Field. High school football is played at Veterans Memorial Stadium

== Notable people ==
- Abigail Adams, wife of John Adams, second President of the United States
- Abigail "Nabby" Adams Smith, daughter of Abigail and John
- Brooks Adams, noted historian
- Charles Francis Adams Sr., diplomat, son of John Quincy Adams
- Charles Francis Adams Jr., Civil War general, president of Union Pacific Railroad (1884–1890)
- Charles Francis Adams III, 44th Secretary of the Navy, mayor of Quincy
- Charles Adams (1770–1800), lawyer, son of John Adams
- John Adams Sr., father of president John Adams, grandfather of president John Quincy Adams
- John Adams, second President of the United States, first Vice President, founding father of U.S.
- John Quincy Adams, sixth President of the United States
- John Quincy Adams II, lawyer and politician
- Louisa Adams, wife of John Quincy Adams, sixth President of the United States
- Thomas Boylston Adams, Massachusetts Representative, justice
- Paul W. Airey, first Chief Master Sergeant of the Air Force
- Carl Andre, minimalist artist
- Barbara Baldavin, actress
- Louis Bell, Grammy Award-nominated record producer and songwriter
- Henry Beston, writer and naturalist
- Clara Blandick (1876–1962), actress, "Auntie Em" in The Wizard of Oz
- Eva Maria Brown (1856–1917), social reformer
- William R. Caddy, Medal of Honor recipient
- Karen Cashman, 1994 Winter Olympics speed skating bronze medalist
- Priscilla Chan, philanthropist and spouse of Mark Zuckerberg
- John Cheever, novelist
- Ken Coleman, sportscaster, called Boston Red Sox games from 1966 to 1974 and again from 1979 to 1989
- Dick Dale, surf guitarist
- Bill Dana, comedian (famous as "José Jiménez")
- William Delahunt, U.S. congressman for 10th District
- Peter Del Vecho, Oscar-winning producer of Frozen
- Dick Donovan, major league pitcher with the Boston Braves, Chicago White Sox and Cleveland Indians
- Joe Dudek, Denver Broncos player, college football Hall of Famer and 1985 Heisman Trophy candidate
- Joseph Dunford, 19th Chairman of the Joint Chiefs of Staff and 36th Commandant of the Marine Corps
- Billy De Wolfe, actor
- Illeana Douglas, actress
- Esther Grace Earl (1994–2010), Vlogger/ YouTuber/ Author/ Nerdfighter/ Activist in the Harry Potter Alliance
- Dick Flavin, poet laureate of Boston Red Sox
- Gwen Gillen, artist and sculptor
- Ruth Gordon, Oscar-winning actress and screenwriter
- John Hancock, patriot and president of Continental Congress
- Howard Deering Johnson, founder of Howard Johnson's chain
- John F. Keenan, State Senator from Norfolk and Plymouth district
- Pete Kendall, offensive lineman for NFL's Washington Redskins
- Helen Ketola, All-American Girls Professional Baseball League player
- Jake Kilrain, champion bare-knuckles boxer (1859–1937)
- Adolph "Jazz" Maffie, bookie, participant in Great Brink's Robbery
- James C. McConville, 40th Chief of Staff of the United States Army and 36th Vice Chief of Staff of the United States Army
- Sheri McCoy, CEO of Avon
- Ralph McLeod, Major League Baseball player (Boston Bees)
- Sam Mele, Major League Baseball player and manager; resided in Quincy while with Boston Red Sox
- Mike Mitchell, actor, comedian, co-host of Doughboys podcast
- Mike Mottau, player for NHL's Boston Bruins
- Donald Murray, Boston Globe columnist
- Francis Wayland Parker, educator
- Everett P. Pope, World War II Medal of Honor recipient
- Mary Pratt, All-American Girls Professional Baseball League player
- Dave O'Brien, sportscaster for ESPN and NESN
- Dorothy Quincy Hancock Scott, socialite, wife of John Hancock
- Edmund Quincy (1628–1698), built Dorothy Quincy House (1685)
- Edmund Quincy (1681–1737), jurist
- Edmund Quincy (1703–1788), merchant
- John Quincy, colonel, General Court representative, and grandfather of Abigail Adams
- Josiah Quincy II, attorney, "the Patriot", newspaper propagandist
- Josiah Quincy III, president of Harvard University (1829–1845), U.S. Representative (1805–1813), Mayor of Boston (1823–1828)
- Josiah Quincy Jr., Mayor of Boston (1846–1848), built Josiah Quincy Mansion
- Josiah Quincy, General Court representative, assistant secretary of the Navy, mayor of Boston (1895–1899)
- Samuel Miller Quincy, lawyer, historian, Civil War soldier, 28th Mayor of New Orleans (May 5, 1865 – June 8, 1865)
- Lee Remick, Oscar-nominated actress
- William B. Rice, industrialist and local philanthropist
- Wilbert Robinson, Baseball Hall of Fame player and manager
- William Rosenberg, founder of Dunkin' Donuts
- Esther R. Sanger (1926–1995), social worker known as "Mother Teresa of South Shore"
- Richard A. Stratton, former United States Navy officer and prisoner of war
- Gordon R. Sullivan, retired United States Army general, who served as 32nd U.S. Army Chief of Staff
- Charles Sweeney, Air Force major general, pilot for Nagasaki nuclear attack
- Pete Varney, Major League Baseball catcher for (Chicago White Sox, Atlanta Braves)
- Lesley Visser, Boston Globe journalist and television sportscaster
- Katharine Augusta Ware (1797–1813), poet and literary magazine editor
- Solomon Willard, builder of the Bunker Hill Monument and creator of first commercial railway in America
- Robert Burns Woodward, awarded Nobel Prize in Chemistry
- Walter Zink, professional baseball pitcher who played for the New York Giants

== Gallery ==
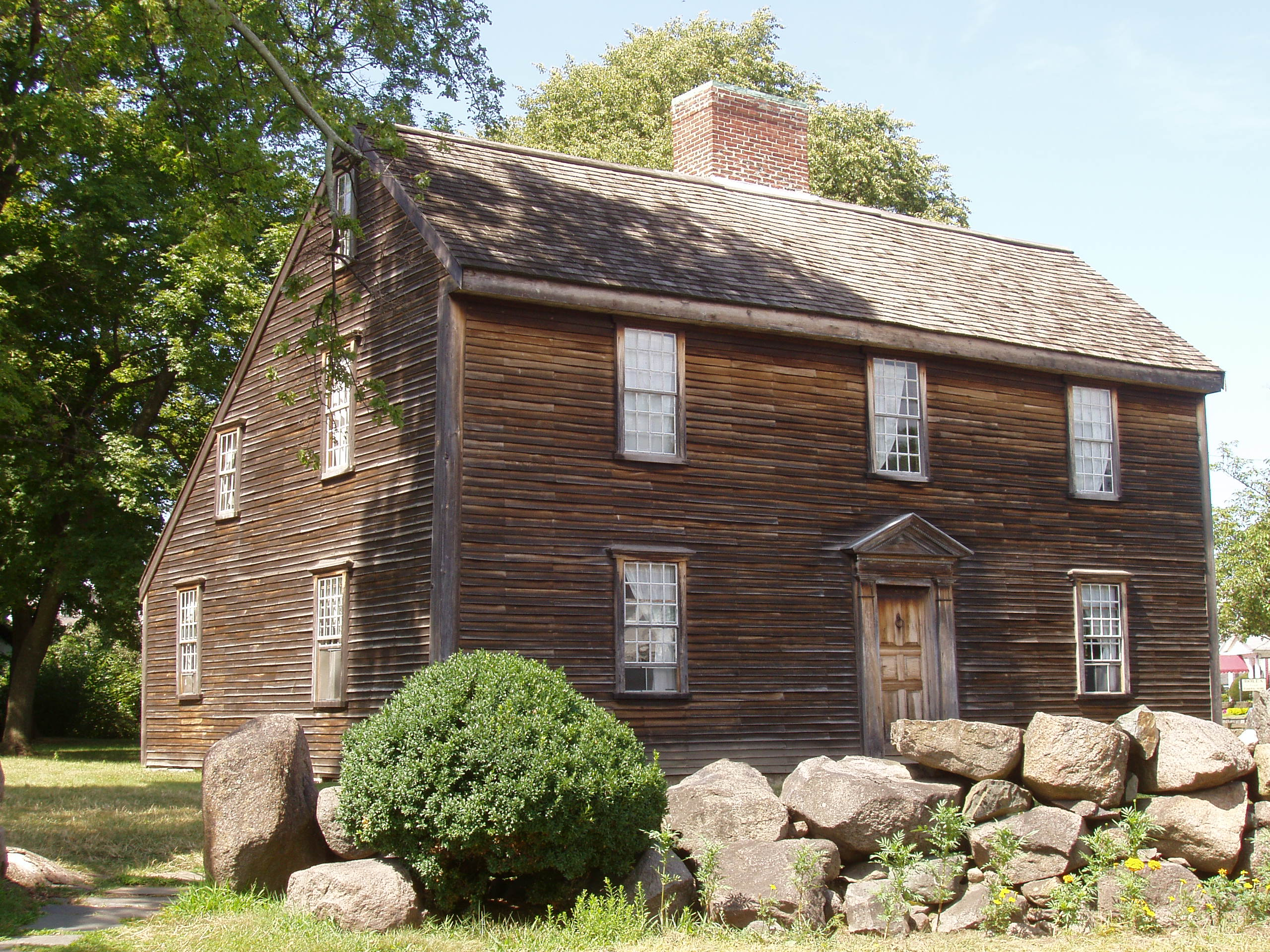
President John Adams' birthplace.

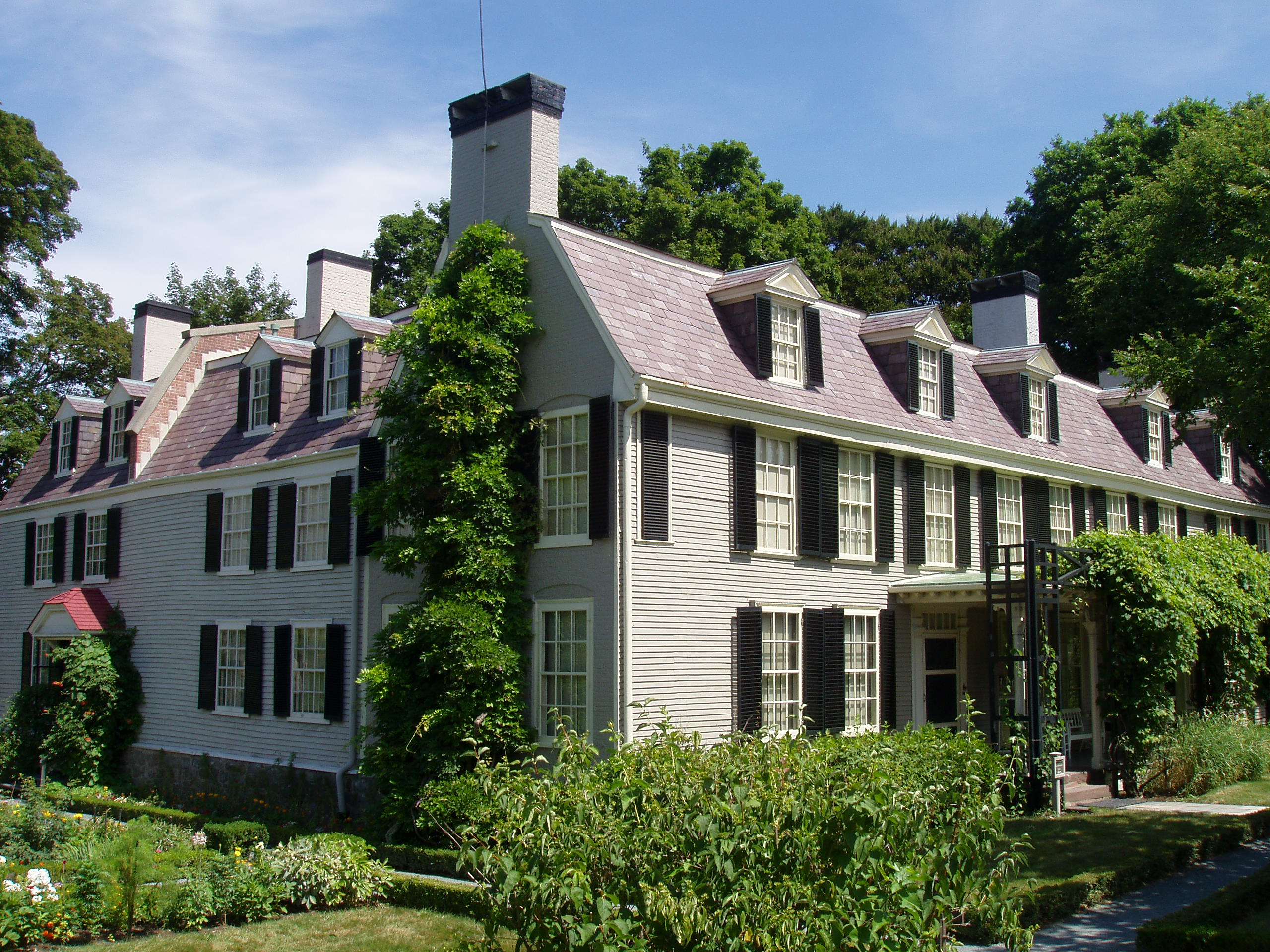
"Peacefield", residence of four generations of the Adams family.

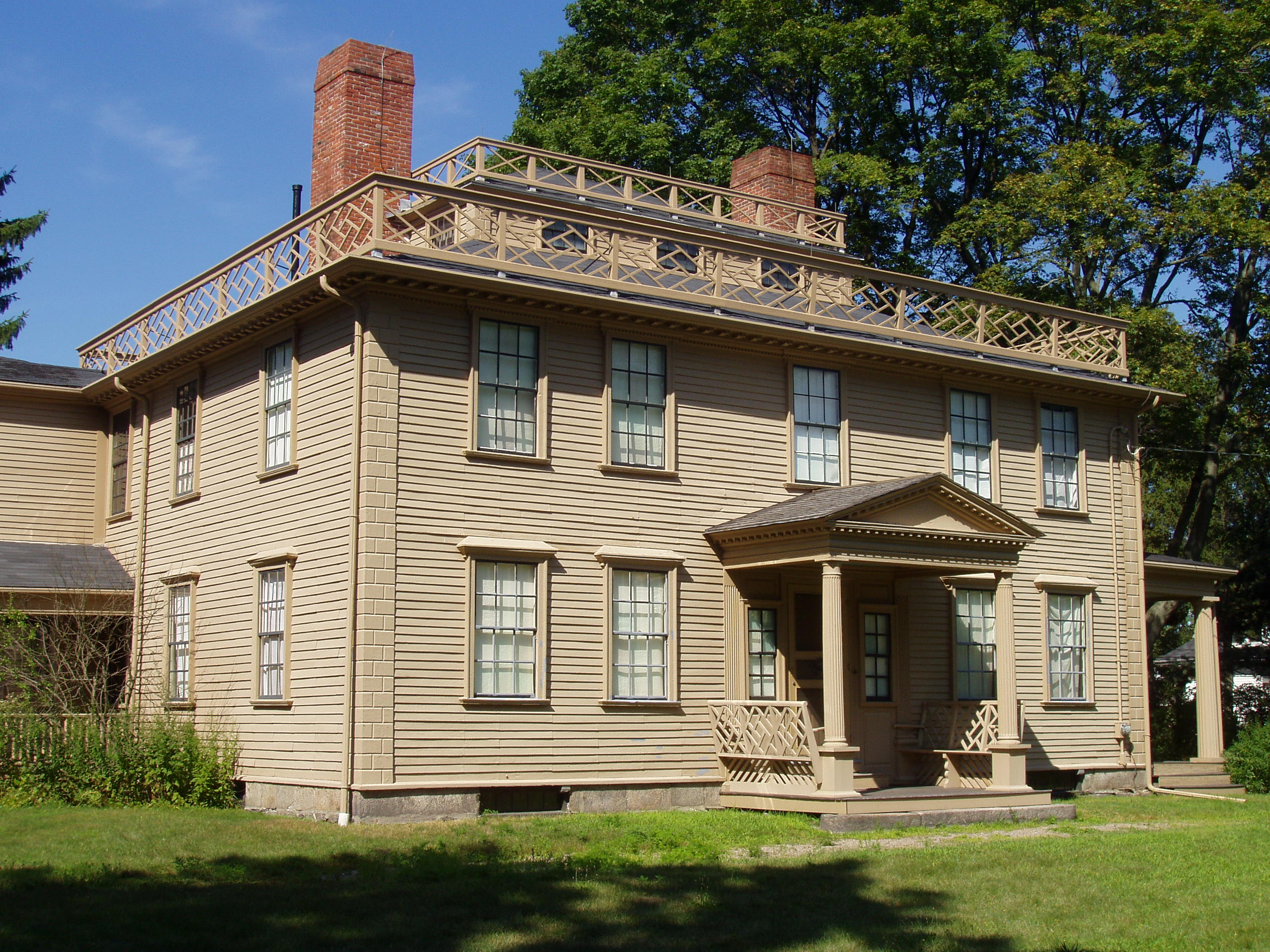
The Josiah Quincy House in Wollaston Park.

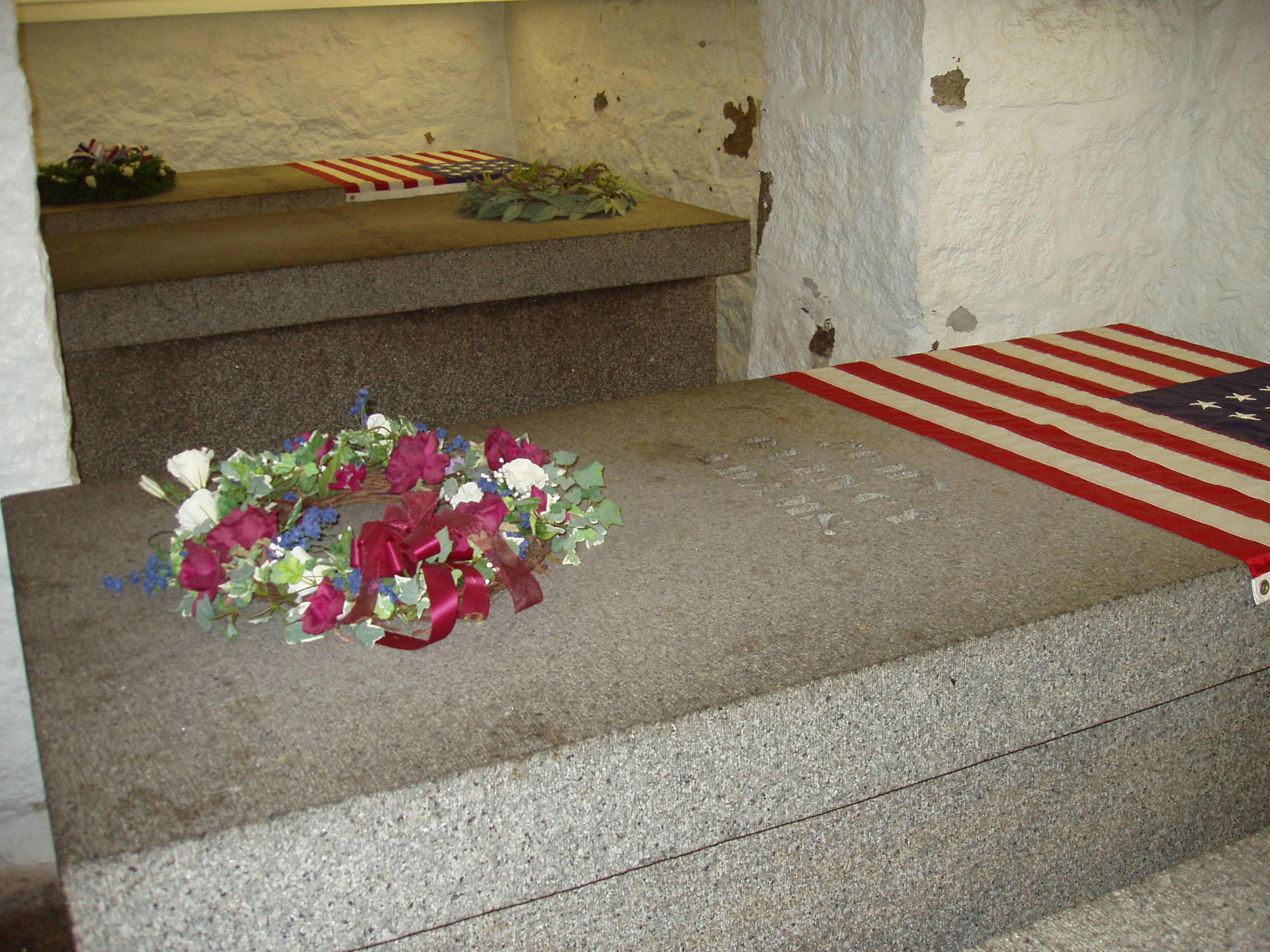
Tombs of Presidents John Adams and John Quincy Adams and their wives, in a family crypt beneath the United First Parish Church in Quincy Center.

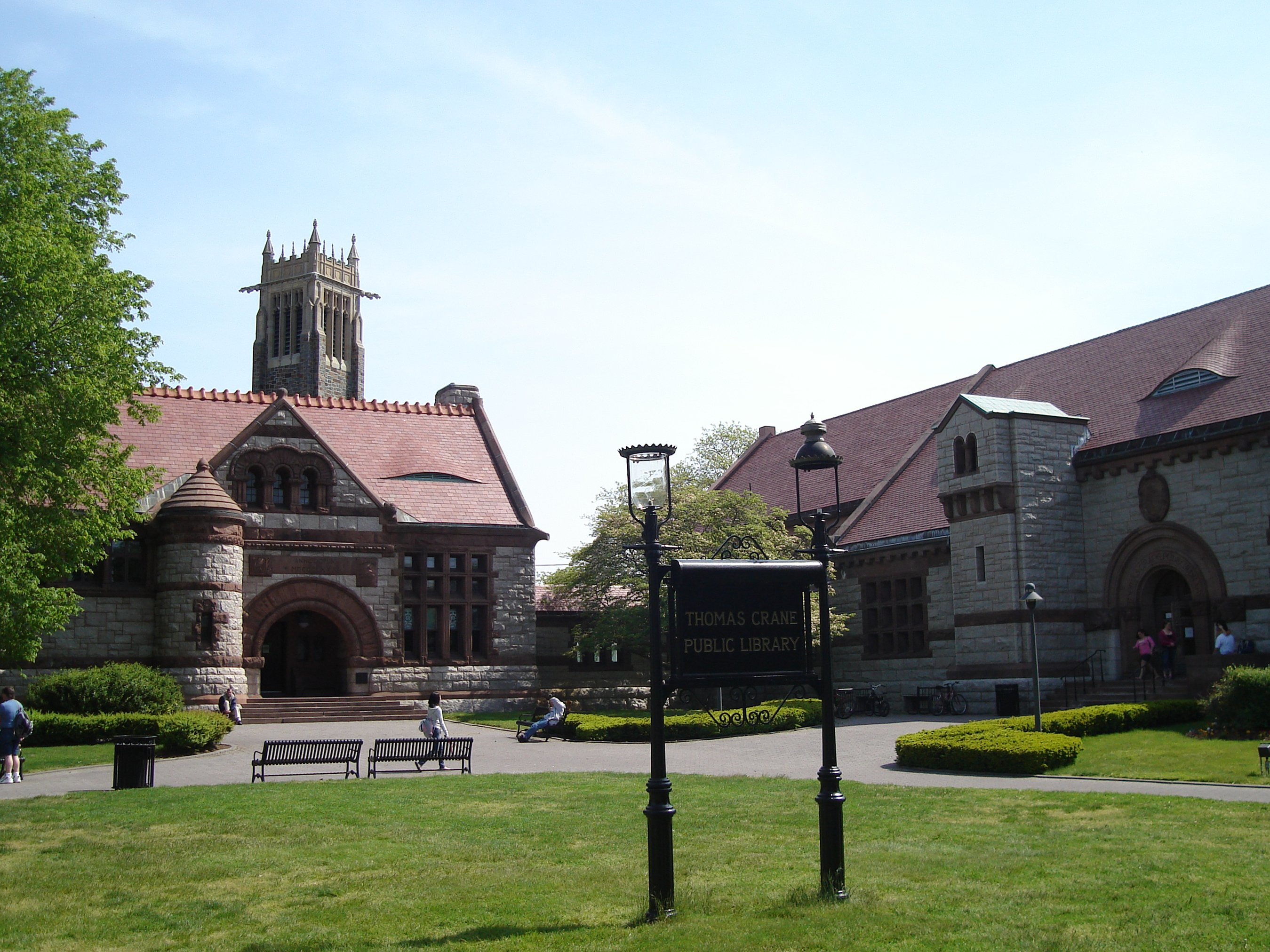
Thomas Crane Public Library

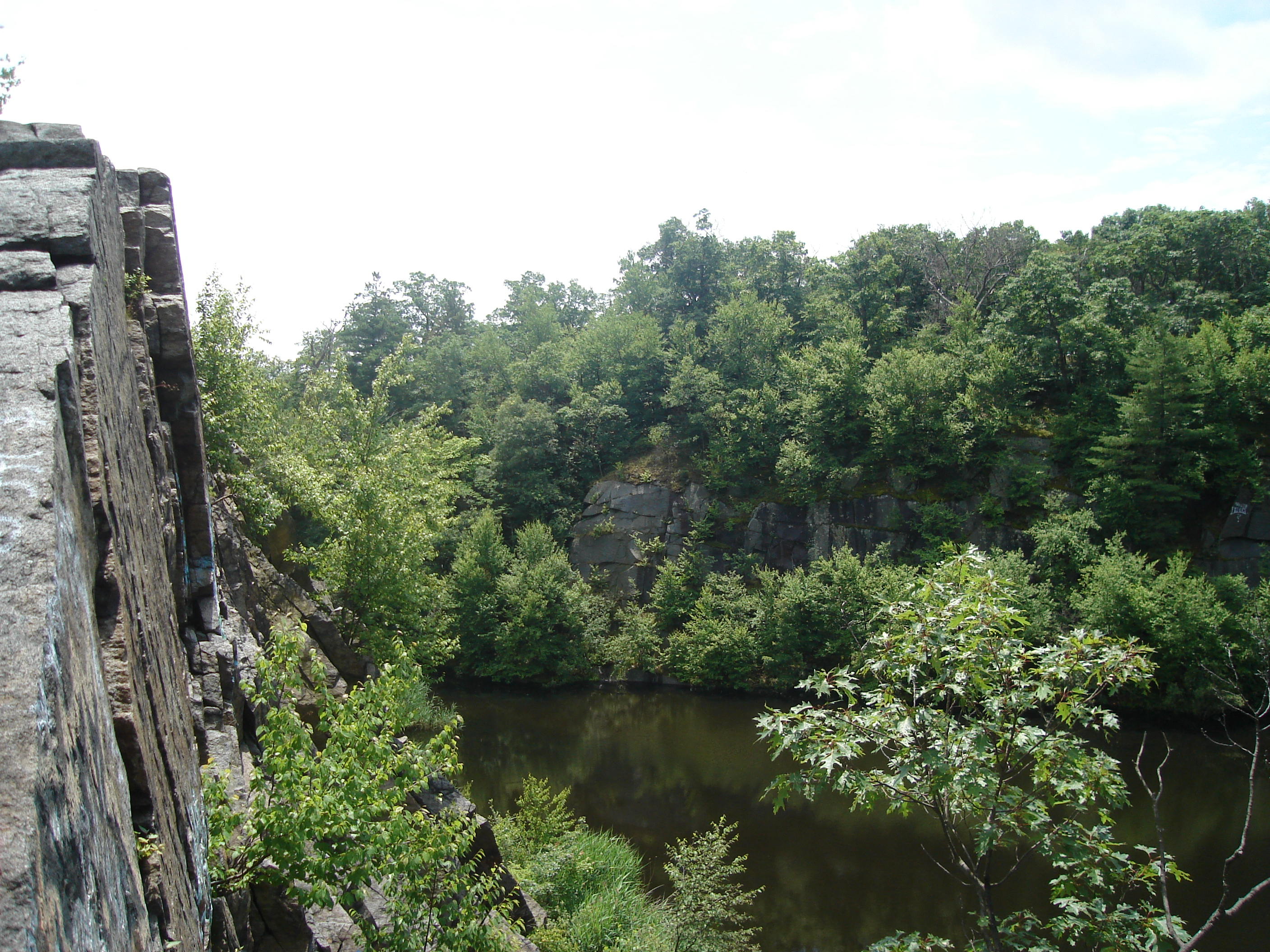
Quincy Quarries Reservation in West Quincy.

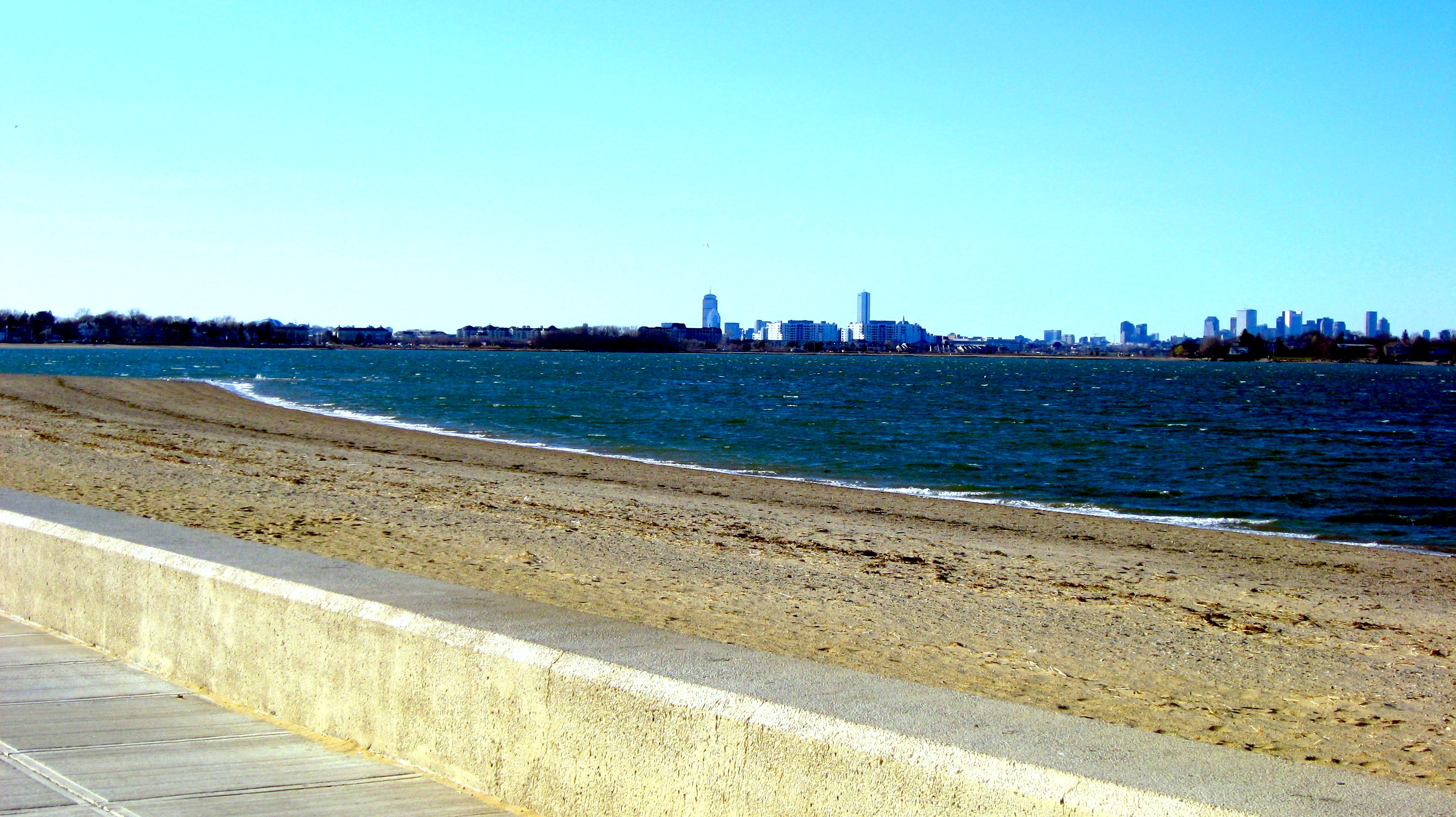
View of Marina Bay and Boston across Quincy Bay from Wollaston Beach.

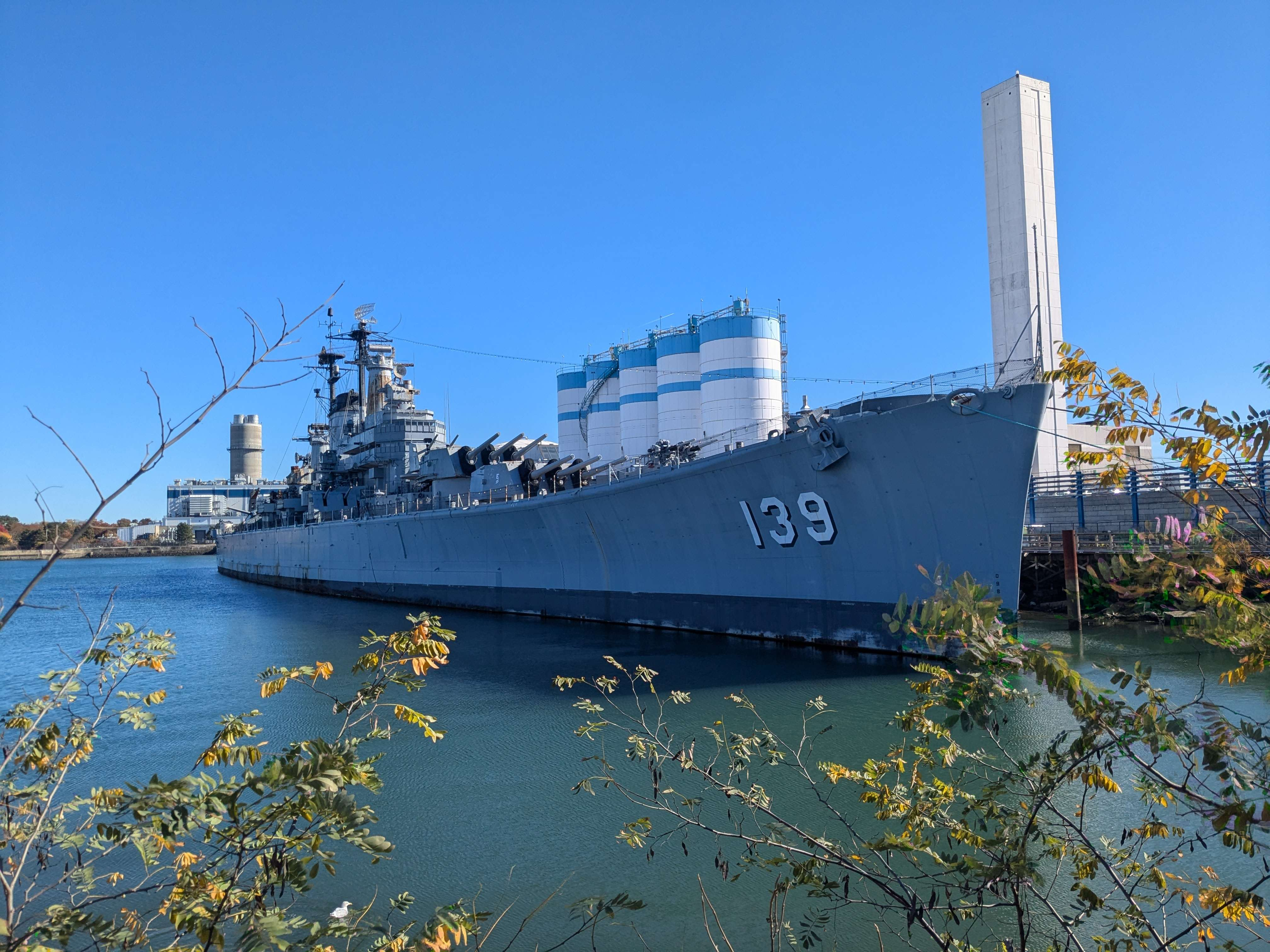
USS Salem (CA-139), site of the United States Naval Shipbuilding Museum.

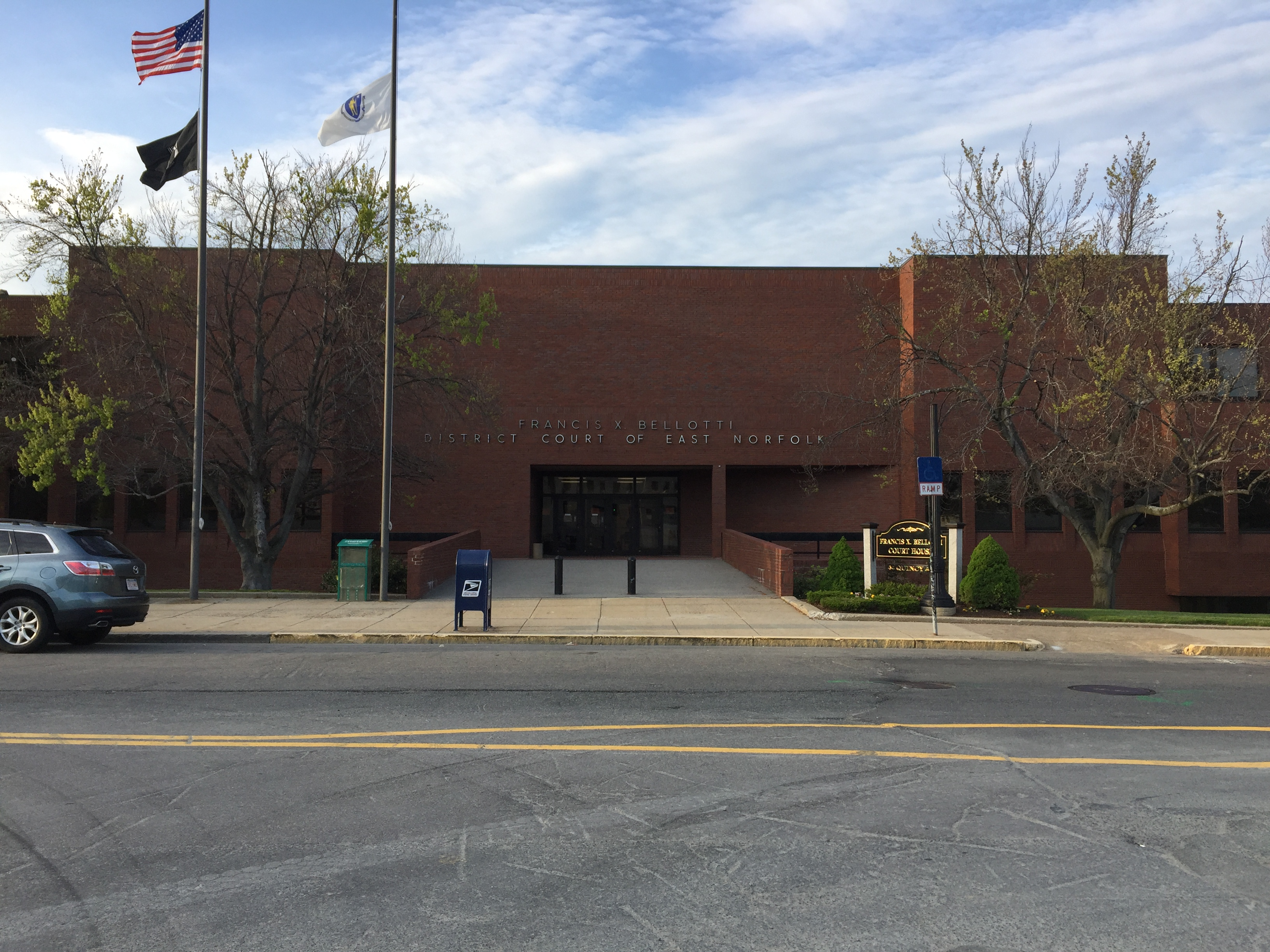
Francis X. Bellotti Courthouse

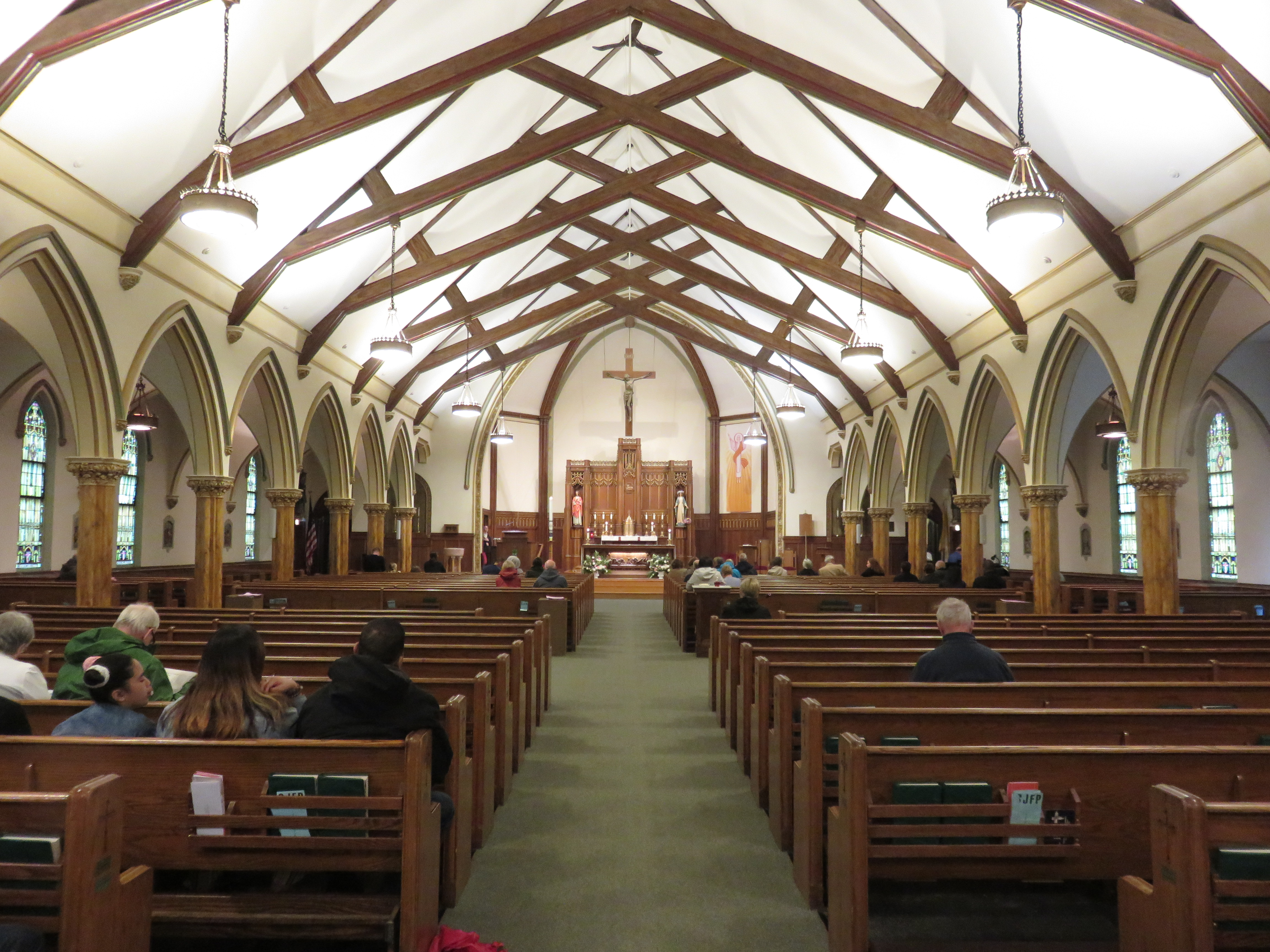
Interior of St. John the Baptist Catholic Church

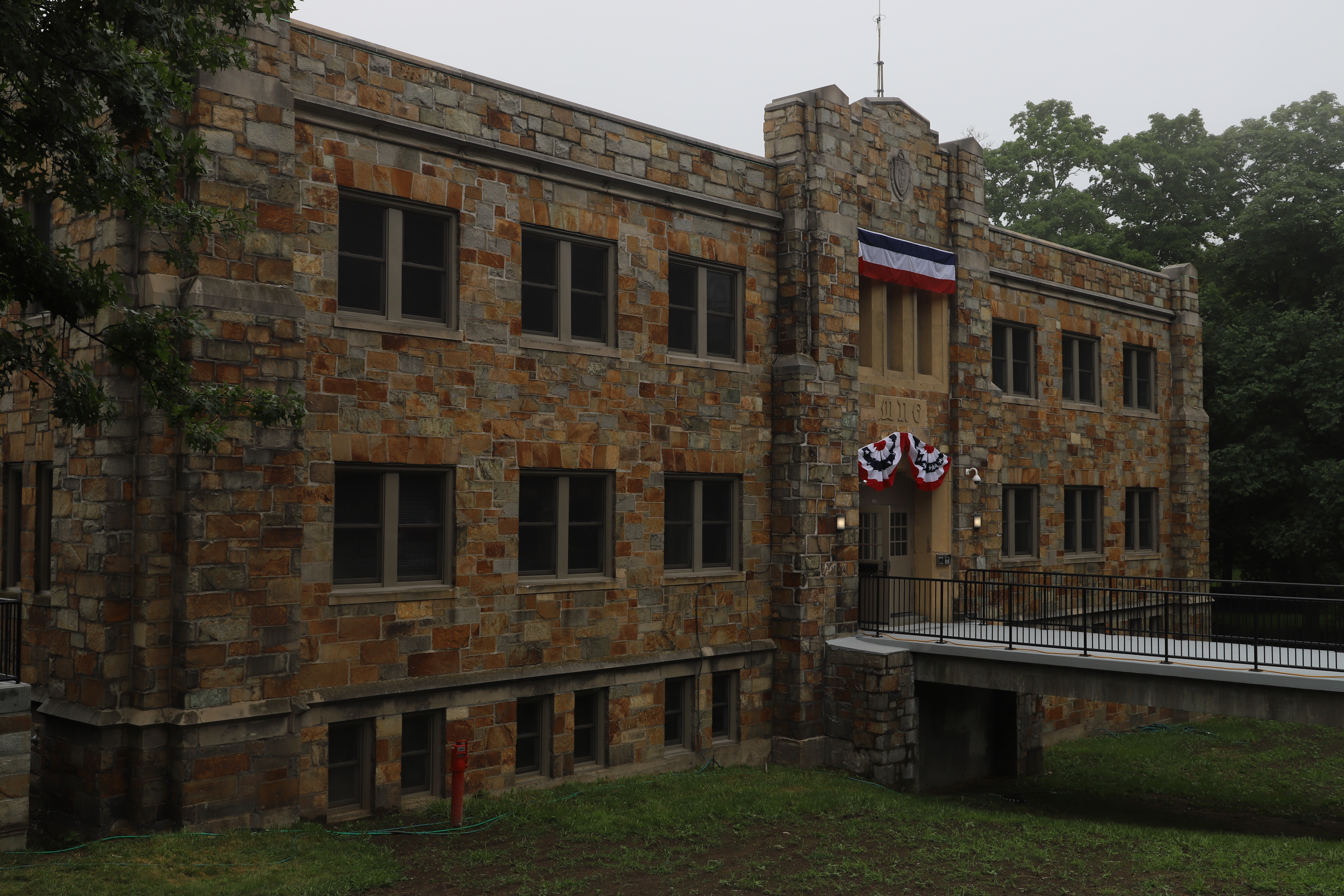
The Massachusetts National Guard's Kelley Armory in Wollaston

== See also ==
- Quincy Mansion
- Quincy Mosque
- National Register of Historic Places listings in Quincy, Massachusetts
- USS Quincy, 3 ships
