= Quincy Center =

Coordinates: 42.251425°N 71.003652°W

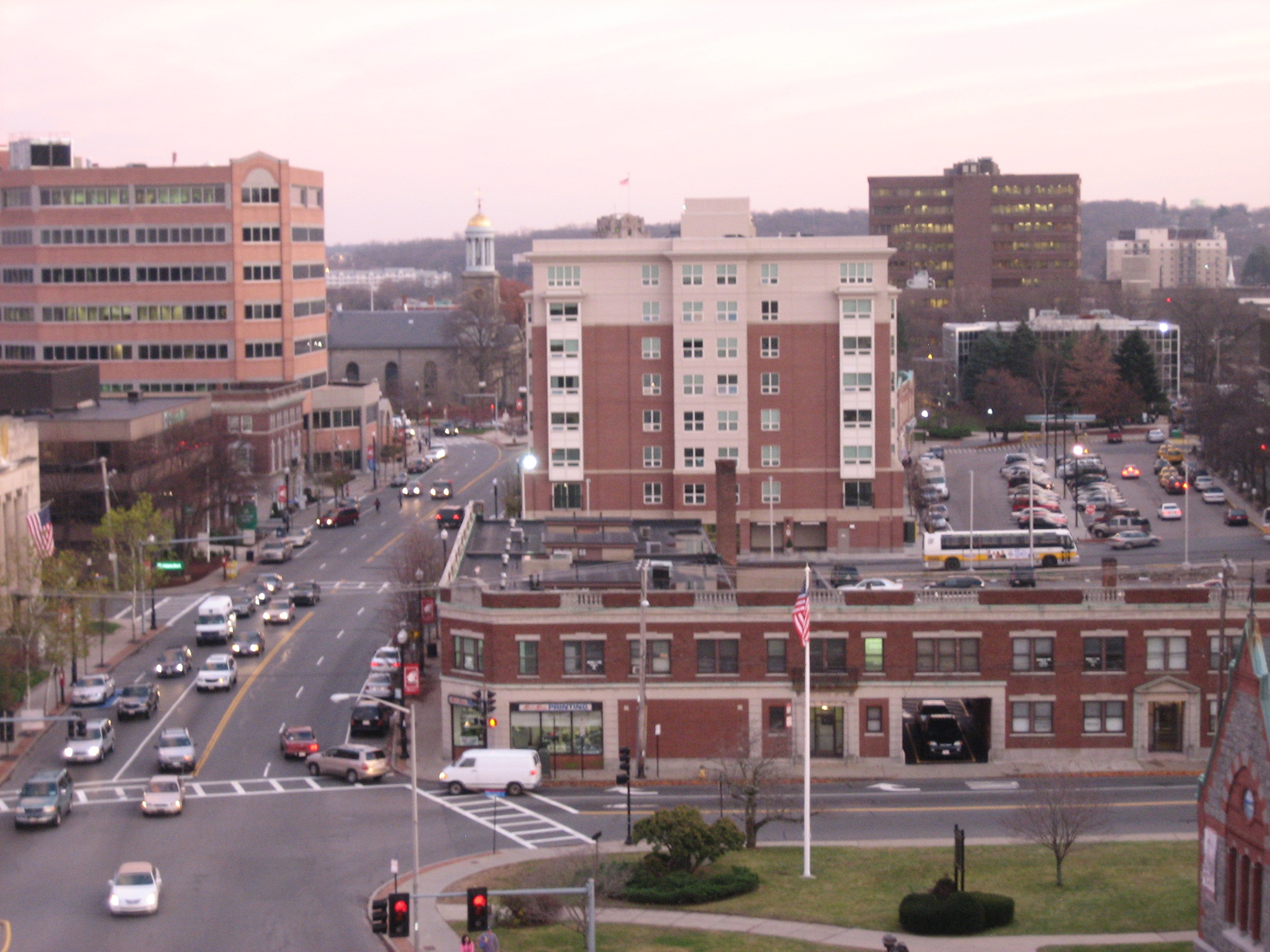
View of Quincy Center from Adams Street and Hancock Street.

Quincy Center is an area of Quincy, Massachusetts, centered along Hancock Street and covering the downtown area of the city. The area is a retail shopping locale and also includes the City Hall, the Thomas Crane Public Library, several churches, including the United First Parish Church, where John Adams and John Quincy Adams were buried, and numerous office buildings, including the headquarters of Stop & Shop. A memorial to the soldiers of World War I along with various statues of other great figures can be found in the vicinity. It is served by a large Massachusetts Bay Transportation Authority (MBTA) station which includes subway access and bus services.

== Annual events ==
Sidewalk Sale - takes place over one weekend in July. This is a very popular event when people come from all around to buy items and enjoy rides and fun events, similar to a block party. A portion of Hancock Street is blocked off, and many local stores and business set up canopies along the street to conduct business with the patrons.

Thanksgiving Day Parade - takes place the Saturday morning before Thanksgiving and features various local groups, marching bands, and Thanksgiving themed floats.

Christmas Parade - takes place the Sunday afternoon after Thanksgiving and features various local groups, marching bands, Christmas themed floats, and concludes once Santa Claus has passed, riding on top of a fire truck. Quincy is one of the few cities/towns outside of Boston to have a Christmas Parade.

Quincy First Night - takes place on the night of December 31 and carries over into January 1. There are numerous ice sculptures located outside of City Hall. Quincy First Night 2009 was canceled due to budget constraints.

Flag Day Parade - takes place on Flag Day afternoon with numerous non-profit organizations and school children marching through Hancock Street with American Flags

== Education ==
Quincy College, Quincy's two-year community college, is located in the Quincy Center neighborhood.
