= Edmund Quincy =

Edmund Quincy may refer to:

- Edmund Quincy (1602–1636), settled Mount Wollaston area of Quincy, Massachusetts around 1628
- Edmund Quincy (1628–1698), colonist, Massachusetts representative, son of Edmund (1602–1636)
- Edmund Quincy (1681–1737), colonist, Massachusetts Supreme Court judge, son of Edmund (1627–1698)
- Edmund Quincy (1703–1788), son of Edmund (1681–1737)
- Edmund Quincy (1726–1782), businessman and land developer, son of Edmund (1703–1788)
- Edmund Quincy (1808–1877), diarist, lecturer, author, abolitionist, son of Josiah Quincy III

== See also ==
- Quincy political family, a prominent political family
