= Josiah Quincy =

Josiah Quincy may refer to:

- Josiah Quincy I (1710–1784), American merchant, planter, soldier, and politician
- Josiah Quincy II (1744–1775), American lawyer and patriot
- Josiah Quincy III (1772–1864), American educator and political figure, mayor of Boston, 1823–1828
- Josiah Quincy Jr. (1802–1882), American politician, mayor of Boston, 1845–1849
- Josiah Quincy (1859–1919), American politician from Massachusetts, mayor of Boston, 1896–1900
- Josiah Quincy (New Hampshire politician) (1793–1875), American politician and lawyer in New Hampshire

== See also ==
- Josiah Quincy House, home of Josiah Quincy I
- Quincy Mansion, also known as the Josiah Quincy Mansion, a summer home built by Josiah Quincy Jr.
- Quincy Market, market complex in Boston, named in honor of Josiah Quincy III
- Quincy political family
- Quincy House (Harvard College), one of twelve undergraduate residential Houses at Harvard University.
