= John Quincy =

American soldier and politician

Speaker of the Massachusetts House of Representatives
- In office 1729–1741
- Preceded by: William Dudley
- Succeeded by: William Fairfield

Personal details
- Born: July 21, 1689 Boston, Dominion of New England
- Died: July 13, 1767 (aged 77) Braintree, Province of Massachusetts Bay
- Resting place: Hancock Cemetery, Quincy
- Spouse: Elizabeth Norton
- Relations: Quincy political family
- Children: Norton Quincy; Anna Quincy Thaxter; Elizabeth Quincy Smith; Lucy Quincy Tufts
- Parents: Daniel Quincy; Anna Shepard
- Relatives: Quincy political family
- Education: Harvard College (1708)
- Occupation: Soldier, Politician

Colonel John Quincy (July 21, 1689 – July 13, 1767) was a Colonial American soldier, politician and member of the Quincy political family. His granddaughter Abigail Adams named her son, the future president John Quincy Adams, after him. Two days after his great-grandson's birth, Quincy died. The city of Quincy, Massachusetts, is named after him.

== Early life ==
John Quincy was born in Boston to Daniel Quincy (1651–1690) and Anna Shepard (1663–1708). Shortly after his birth, the family moved to Braintree, Massachusetts, and established a homestead at Mount Wollaston, or Merry Mount, in what is present-day Quincy. Daniel died when John was one year old; his mother subsequently married the Reverend Moses Fiske. Quincy attended Harvard College, graduating in 1708.

John Quincy's paternal grandparents were Edmund Quincy II (1628-1698) and his first wife, Joanna Hoare Quincy. Edmund Quincy II built the Dorothy Quincy House (1685). His paternal great grandfather's father Edmund Quincy (1602-1636), known as "the Puritan", was an early settler of the Massachusetts Bay Colony.

On the origins of his name, John Quincy Adams writes the Rev. George W. Blagden,

18th September, 1839. Rev. GEORGE W. BLAGDEN, Boston. Dear Sir, — I return, with many thanks, the original copy of the letter of 18th November, 1669, from the members of the South Church to John Hull... Of this marriage, the issue were two children, - Anna, born the 1st and baptized the 7th of June, 1685; and John, born the 21st and baptized the 28th of July, 1689, — both at the South Church. This John Quincy, son of Daniel and Anna Quinsey, was the person whose name I bear. He was the father of Elizabeth Smith (wife of William Smith, minister of Wey mouth), my mother' s mother. He was on his deathbed, at the age of seventy - seven, when I was baptized; and it was at his daughter' s request that his name was given to me. He had been an orphan almost from his birth; his father, Daniel Quinsey, having died at the age of forty, about one year after his birth, in August, 1690. He was graduated at Harvard College in 1708; and, within a year afterwards, his grandmother, Mrs. Anna Shepard, died, and bequeathed to him a farm at Mount Wollaston, where he ever after resided, and died. It was only by the inspection of the record of your church that I ascertained where he had received the right of baptism; and only a few days before that I had discovered, in the Boston Town Records, the time and place of his birth. As one of the children of your church, these particulars concerning him may perhaps be of some interest to you; and they are peculiarly gratifying to me, as they have furnished me the occasion of becoming personally acquainted with you, and of being indebted to your kindness for the inspection of your Church Records. I am, with great respect, dear sir, your obedient servant, JOHN QUINCY ADAMS

—

Quincy inherited Mt. Wollaston, an estate purchased by his great-grandfather, Captain William Tyng, one of Boston's wealthiest merchants, who had acquired the property and other lands from William Coddington (1601–1678), who was in exile.

== Career ==
In 1717, he was elected to represent Braintree at the Massachusetts General Court, was re-elected in 1719, and served in that capacity until 1740. From 1729 to 1741, he served as the Speaker of the House. In 1741, Quincy was voted out of office, but was returned there in 1744, where he served four additional years.

From this welter of confusions Colonel Quincy emerged, inviting confidence by his sane and sagacious judgment. Even in the hour of their infatuation his own towns people did not cease to call upon him to serve on the more exacting committees. After the old fashion he was chosen moderator of the March meeting of 1743, and they also paid him the compliment (the highest they then could) of electing him selectman with his loyal comrade, Lieutenant John Adams; and thus early was it exemplified that the statesmen of this community regard no office too humble for them in which to serve their neighbors and fellow - citizens, and John Quincy, in the simplicity of his devotion to the public good, only showed the true attitude of a citizen in a free democracy. His large experience and abilities were not, however, destined to remain long unemployed in their fulness for the benefit of the entire Province. Once more, in 1744, he was returned to the House of Representatives; and, in all, he was elected four additional years to that body. He did not become again “ the Honorable Speaker, ” but a marked distinction was paid him by his elevation to the higher chamber, as it was accounted, the Governor's Council.

—

== Personal life ==
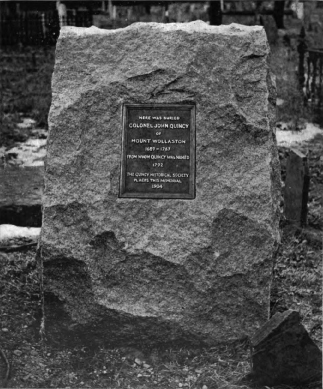
John Quincy's Grave

On September 3, 1715, he married Elizabeth Norton (1696–1769), daughter of the Reverend John Norton of Hingham. Although officially only achieving the rank of major in the colonial militia, he was commonly referred to as "Colonel". Together they had four children:

- Norton Quincy (1716–1801), who married Martha Salisbury (1727–1748)
- Anna Quincy (1719–1799), married John Thaxter (1721–1802)
- Elizabeth Quincy (1721–1775), who married William Smith (1707-1783).
- Lucy Quincy (1729–1785), married Cotton Tufts (1732–1815)

He died on 13 July 1767 at the age of 77, only two days after the birth of his namesake, John Quincy Adams, and one month before the duty on tea had been imposed by Act of Parliament of June 14, 1767.

=== Descendants ===
The Colonel was Elizabeth Quincy Smith's father and grandfather of Abigail Smith Adams (1744–1818). Abigail Smith Adams was first Second Lady of the United States and second First Lady of the United States being married to John Adams. John Quincy Adams (1767–1848), her son, was 6th President of the United States, serving from 1825 to 1829. He also served as a diplomat, a Senator and member of the United States House of Representatives.

=== Honors ===
The city of Quincy, Massachusetts, is named after him.

Preceded by William Dudley	Speaker of the Massachusetts House of Representatives; 1729 – 1741	Succeeded by William Fairfield
