= Wollaston (Quincy, Massachusetts) =

Neighborhood in Quincy, Massachusetts

Coordinates: 42°16′00″N 71°00′52″W

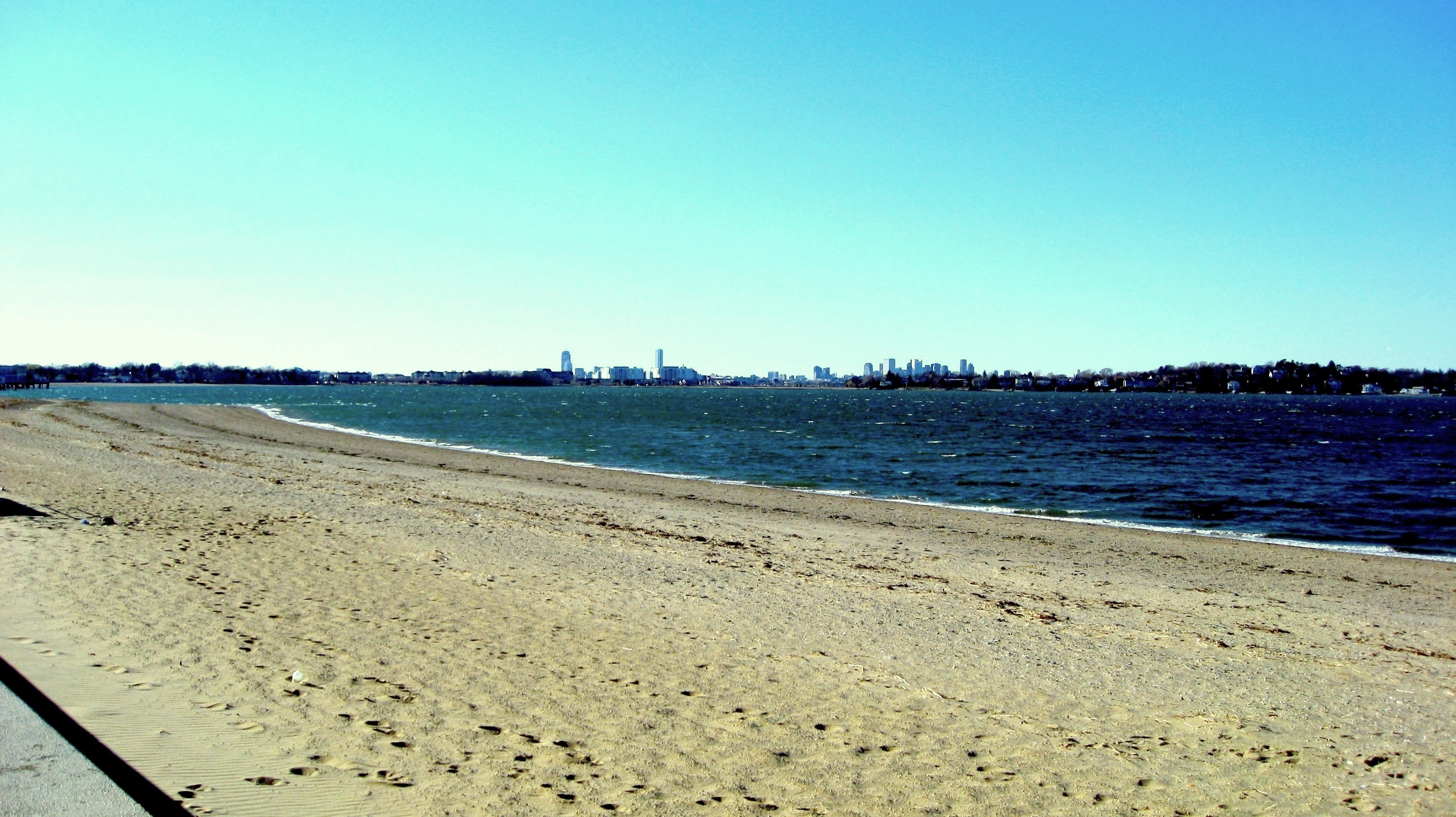
Wollaston Beach, with the Boston skyline in the background, in April 2009

Wollaston, Massachusetts, is a neighborhood in the city of Quincy, Massachusetts. Divided by Hancock Street or Route 3A, the Wollaston Beach side is known as Wollaston Park, while the Wollaston Hill side is known as Wollaston Heights.

It is bordered by North Quincy to the north, Quincy Bay to the east, Merrymount and Quincy Center to the southeast and south, and Milton, Massachusetts, to the west. Wollaston is served by the Wollaston Station on the B branch of the MBTA Red Line, which runs north-south from Cambridge, Massachusetts (Alewife), to Braintree, Massachusetts (Train Station).

Mount Wollaston, a similar-sounding 17th-century designation for Quincy, is now associated with a cemetery in the current neighborhood of Merrymount in Quincy.

== Early history ==
In 1624, Thomas Morton emigrated from England to the Plymouth Colony in the company of Captain Richard Wollaston. Unable to get along with the Pilgrim authorities in Plymouth Colony, Wollaston and Morton left the colony in 1625 with a company of 30 or 40 colonists. They cleared the land and built log-huts on the seaward slopes of the hills in what is now Merrymount. The present-day Wollaston neighborhood is located west and northwest of the original location of the early colonial settlement.

Wollaston was the home of William and Anne Hutchinson following their emigration from England in 1636. It was in Wollaston that Anne began her career as a pioneering female preacher in colonial America. William and Eunice Cole first settled in Mount Wollaston upon their arrival from England and were granted 2 acres (8,100 m^{2}) of land on February 20, 1637, though they left for Exeter, New Hampshire, before the year was out. Today, Eunice Cole is better known as Goody Cole and was convicted of witchcraft in Hampton, New Hampshire, in 1656, the only woman to have ever been convicted of such charges in New Hampshire.

== The Quincy family ==
Edmund Quincy, progenitor of the illustrious Quincy family after whom Quincy Market in Boston and the city of Quincy are named, emigrated to Massachusetts in 1633. On December 14, 1635, he received a grant of land, approximately 400 acres (1.6 km^{2}), where his son established the Quincy Homestead. Four generations later, Josiah Quincy I built a mansion, the Josiah Quincy House, on a 200-acre (0.81 km^{2}) site known as the "Lower Farm." The house still stands on Muirhead Street in Wollaston. In 1848, the fourth Josiah Quincy built another, the "Josiah Quincy Mansion," as his summer home. The Quincy family land in Wollaston, which bordered on Adams family land, was passed from the Quincy's to the Adams' via Abigail Smith's marriage to John Adams.

== 19th century ==
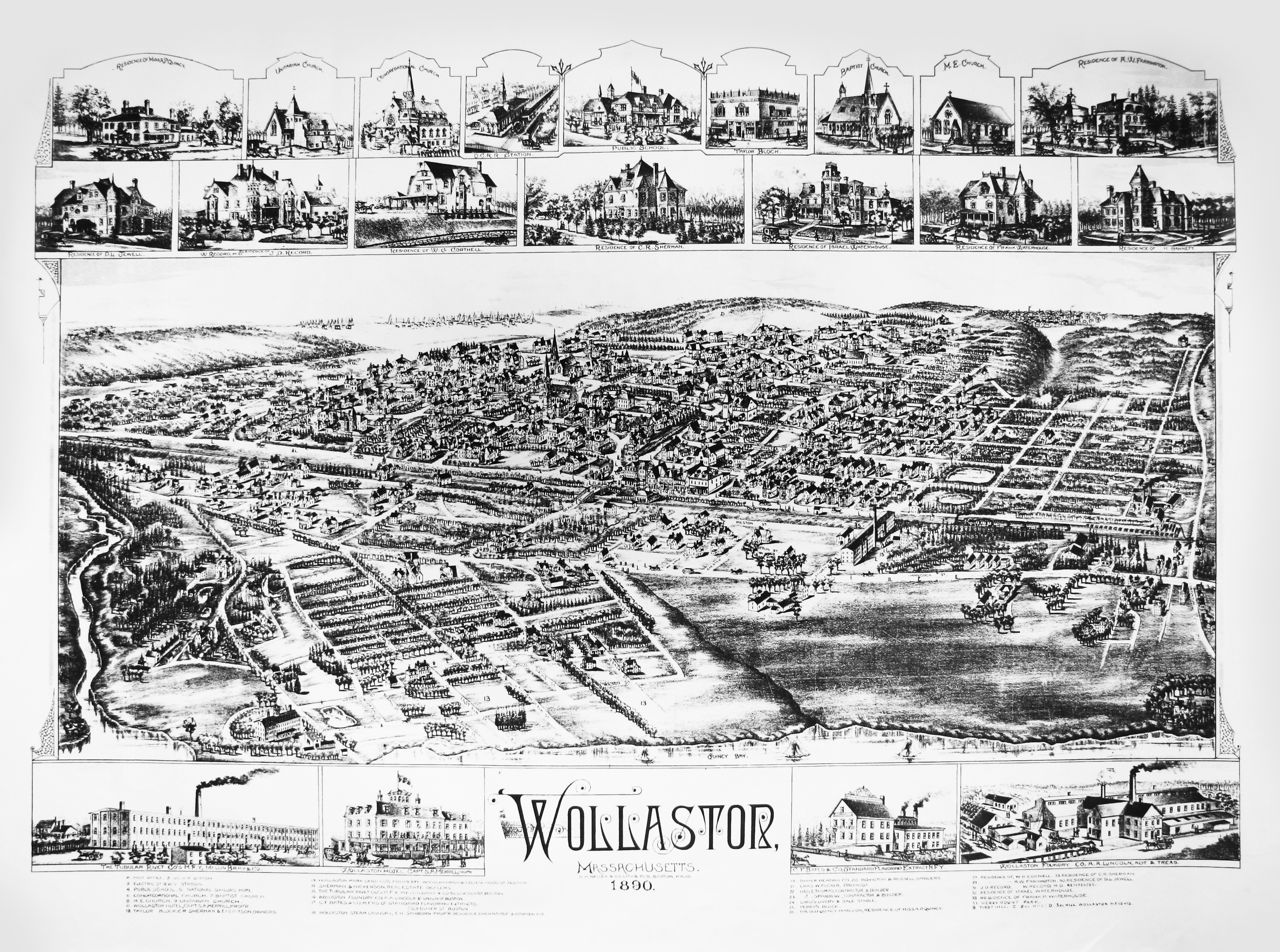
Wollaston in 1890

The Quincy land was later developed in the 1870s and 1880s as a fine residential neighborhood: one of the area's first commuter neighborhoods. Residents were given a one-year free pass on the Old Colony Railroad, from Wollaston Station to downtown Boston. The Wollaston MBTA station occupies the same site as the old station.

In 1896, the Quincy estate was subdivided into "prestigious building lots" called Wollaston Park, and the Josiah Quincy Mansion became part of the 12-acre (49,000 m^{2}) campus of the Quincy Mansion School for Girls.

The Wollaston Yacht Club was incorporated in 1897 to promote boating and community in Quincy Bay and is still active, along with its sister organization, Squantum Yacht Club.

== 20th century ==
In 1919, Wollaston became home to the Eastern Nazarene College, which moved onto the old Quincy Mansion School property. The Mansion stood as part of the college until 1969. Angell Hall is now in the spot on campus where the Mansion once stood.

The first Howard Johnson's restaurant was established in Wollaston in 1925. The city of Quincy has placed a stone marker next to the Wollaston MBTA station parking lot, designating that location as the original site of the first Howard Johnson's. The building was torn down before the opening of the new Wollaston station in 1971. The original Howard Johnson offices were located a short distance up the street, on the corner of Beale Street and Newport Avenue. The initials "HJ" can be seen in tiles on the walkway in front of the Beale Street entrance. Eastern Nazarene bought the old candy factory and executive offices on Old Colony Avenue in the late 1990s and developed them into its Old Colony Campus.

The basement of what is now a Japanese restaurant at the corner of Hancock Street and Bass Street is rumored to have served as the original rehearsal room for the Dropkick Murphys when the popular Irish-influenced punk band was starting out in the mid-1990s.

Both actress Ruth Gordon and author John Cheever were born on Winthrop Avenue on Wollaston Hill, and American character actor Billy De Wolfe was also born in Wollaston.

== See also ==
- Eastern Nazarene College
- Quincy, Massachusetts
- Wollaston (MBTA Station)
- Wollaston Beach
- Wollaston Theatre
