= Anna Cabot Quincy Waterston =

American writer

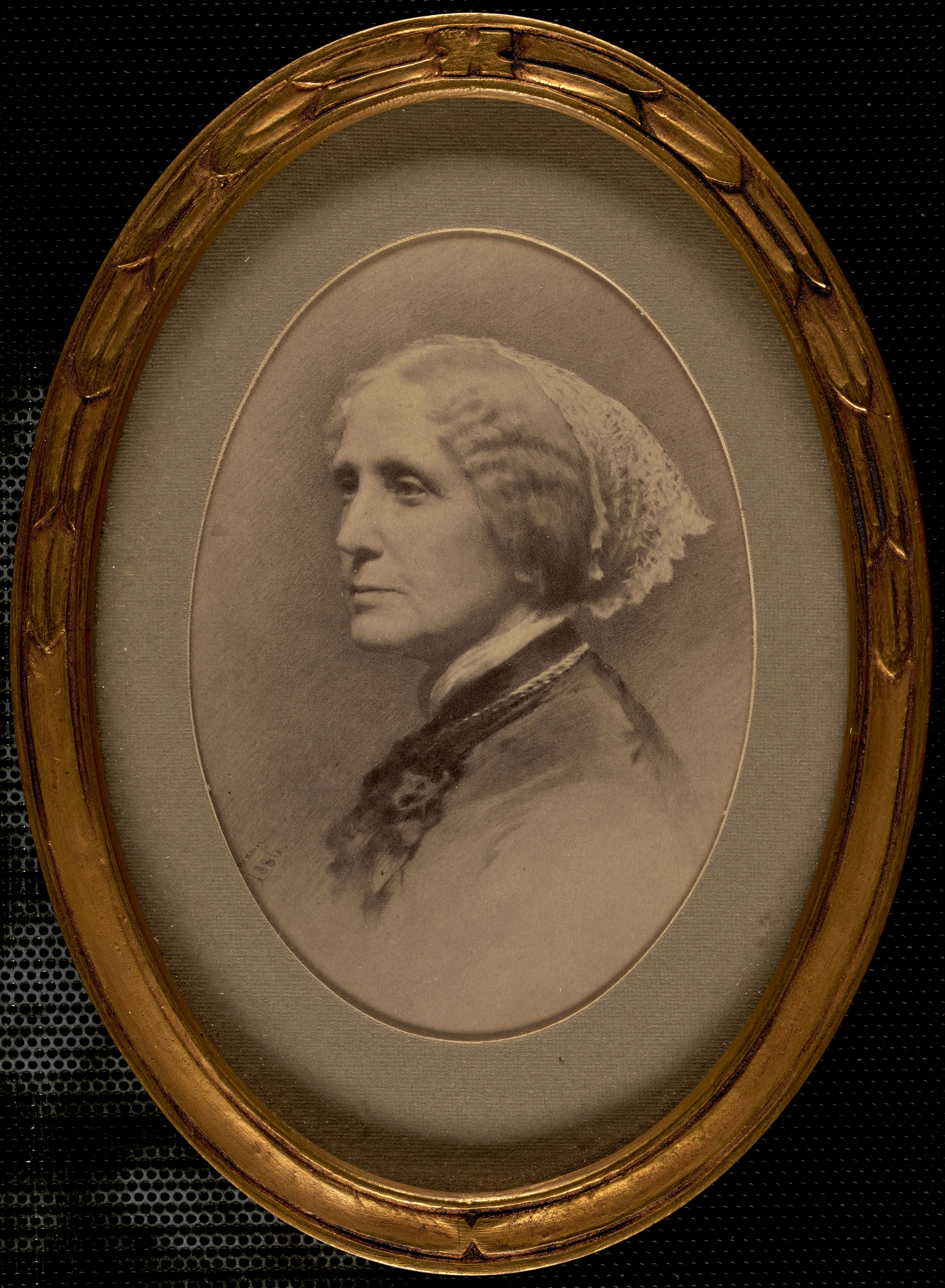
- Born: Anna Cabot Lowell Quincy; June 27, 1812; Boston, Massachusetts, U.S.
- Died: October 14, 1899 (aged 87); Newton, Massachusetts, U.S.
- Resting place: Mount Auburn Cemetery
- Occupation: Writer
- Spouse: Robert C. Waterston (m. 1840; died 1893)
- Children: Helen Ruthven Waterston
- Parent: Josiah Quincy III
- Relatives: Josiah Quincy II (grandfather); Josiah Quincy Jr. & Edmund Quincy (brothers)
- Writing career
- Pen name: A. C. Q. W.; W. A. C. Q.
- Language: English
- Genres: poems, novels, hymns, diary

Anna Cabot Quincy Waterston (née, Quincy; pen names, A. C. Q. W. and W. A. C. Q.; June 27, 1812 – October 14, 1899) was a 19th-century American writer from Massachusetts. The youngest daughter of Boston's mayor and Harvard University president Josiah Quincy III, she was a member of a prominent family with a wide circle of friends, and was intimately associated with many distinguished people of her era. Waterston published her works, including poems, novels, hymns, and articles in The Atlantic Monthly. Her diary was published posthumously. A sculptor created a carved marble bust of Waterston that is held by the Smithsonian American Art Museum.

== Early life and family ==
Anna Cabot Lowell Quincy was born June 27, 1812, in Boston, Massachusetts. She was the youngest daughter of Josiah Quincy III, who served as president of Harvard University, U.S. Representative, and Mayor of Boston. Her mother was Eliza Susan Morton Quincy. Anna's grandfather, Josiah Quincy II, had also served as mayor of Boston, as did her brother, Josiah. Her other siblings were: Eliza, Abigail, Maria, Margaret, and Edmund.

On April 21, 1840, she married Rev. Robert C. Waterston (1812–93). After passing two years in Europe, and, just as they were all about to return home, their daughter, Helen Ruthven Waterston (1841 - July 25, 1858), died at Naples, Italy.

== Career ==
Some of Waterston's verses were printed in 1863, in a small volume. She also published articles in The Atlantic Monthly. Her pen names included, "A. C. Q. W.", and "W. A. C. Q.".

In 1870, after visiting Jeanne Carr, Waterston left Oakland, California, for Yosemite. Waterston was able to gather around her a wide circle of friends and acquaintances. She knew well and was intimately associated with many of the most distinguished people of the former generation. When her father entertained Lafayette, she was a school girl, but the occasions made such an impression upon her mind that she retained a vivid remembrance of it in later years. The cause of the blind was important to her ever since the establishment of the Perkins Institution and Massachusetts School for the Blind.

== Death and legacy ==
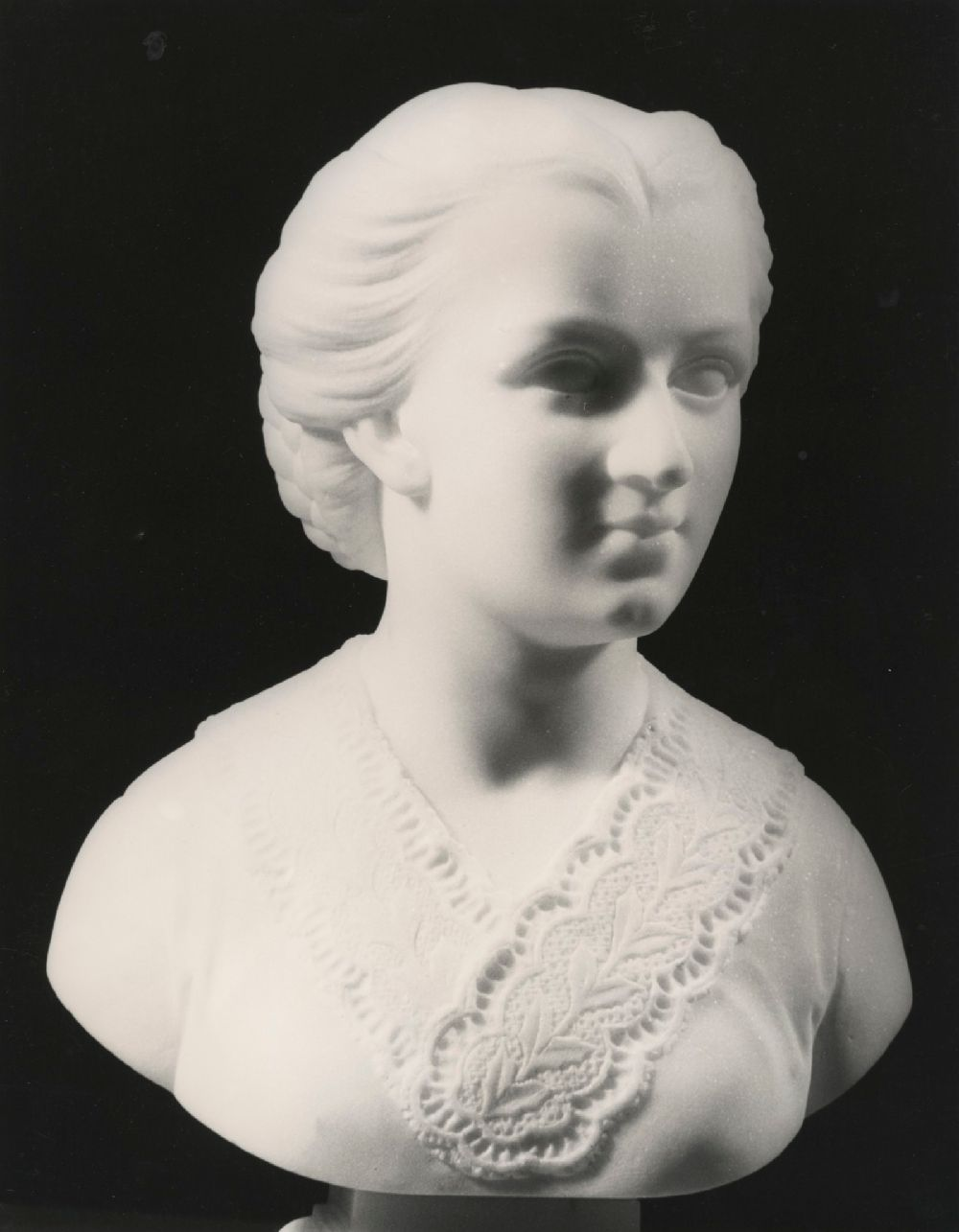
Edmonia Lewis, Anna Quincy Waterston, 1866, photo by David Finn, ©David Finn Archive, Department of Image Collections, National Gallery of Art Library, Washington, DC

Waterston died October 14, 1899, at her home, No. 526 Massachusetts Avenue, in Newton, Massachusetts, where she lived since 1860, and was buried at Mount Auburn Cemetery. Her carved marble bust was sculpted by Edmonia Lewis and is held by the Smithsonian American Art Museum. In 2003, her diary, written at the age of seventeen, was posthumously published under the title A Woman's Wit and Whimsy.

== Selected works ==
- Quincy
- Sketchbook, ca. 1835
- Together, 1863
- Verses, 1863
- Edmonia Lewis. (The young colored woman who has successfully modelled the bust of Colonel Shaw.)., 1865
- Adelaide Phillipps: A Record. Boston: A. Williams and Company, 1883.

=== Posthumously published ===
- A Woman's Wit & Whimsy: The 1833 Diary of Anna Cabot Lowell Quincy, edited by Beverly Wilson Palmer. Boston: Northeastern University Press, 2003.

== See also ==
- Quincy political family
