= Quincy political family =

Political family in Massachusetts, US

Quincy
- Political family
- Coat of Arms of Edmund Quincy, family patriarch
- Country: United States
- Current region: New England
- Earlier spellings: de Quincy, Cuincy
- Etymology: from Cuincy
- Origin: Braintree, Massachusetts
- Founder: Edmund Quincy
- Members: See below
- Connected families: Adams
- Estate: Mount Wollaston

The Quincy family (/ˈkwɪn.zi/, KWIN-zee) was a prominent political family in Massachusetts from the mid-17th century through to the early 20th century. It is connected to the Adams political family through Abigail Adams.

The family estate was in Mount Wollaston, first independent, then part of Braintree, Massachusetts, and now the city of Quincy. The remaining pieces of the Quincy homestead are the Josiah Quincy House and the Dorothy Quincy Homestead, after the land was broken up into building lots called Wollaston Park in the 19th century and the Josiah Quincy Mansion was demolished in 1969.

The names of President John Quincy Adams, several American towns, USS Quincy, Quincy House at Harvard, Quincy House in Washington, D.C., and Quincy Market in Boston are among the legacies of the Quincy family name.

== History ==
The first recorded Quincy sailed with William the Conqueror across the English Channel from Normandy in 1066 to crush the English forces at the Battle of Hastings. In 1215, Saer de Quincy, Earl of Winchester, rode to Runnymede, one of the barons who forced King John of England to sign the Magna Carta, which guaranteed English freemen the right to trial by jury.

== Members ==
- Edmund Quincy (1602–1636) I, who emigrated to Boston 1633 and settled Mount Wollaston 1635, married Judith Pares (d. 1654)
  - Judith Quincy (1626–1695), married John Hull (1624–1683), merchant and Massachusetts Bay Colony politician
    - Hannah Hull (1657-1717), married Samuel Sewall (1652-1730), judge during the Salem witch trials
  - Edmund Quincy (1628–1698) II, who built the Dorothy Quincy House (1685), married Joanna Hoar (1625–1680) and remarried to Elizabeth Gookin Eliot (1645–1700)
    - Daniel Quincy (1651–1690), Boston merchant and ker, married Anna Shephard (1663–1708)
      - Anna Quincy (1685–1717), married John Holman (1679–1759)
      - Colonel John Quincy (1689–1767): Quincy, Massachusetts and John Quincy Adams were both named in his honor. Quincy was Abigail Adams' grandfather. He was John Quincy Adams' great-grandfather. John married Elizabeth Norton (1696–1769) of Hingham, daughter of Rev. John Norton, pastor of Old Ship Church.
        - Norton Quincy (1716–1801), public servant, recluse, married Martha Salisbury (1727–1748)
        - Anna Quincy (1719–1799), married John Thaxter (1721–1802) of Hingham
        - Elizabeth Quincy (1721–1775), married the Reverend William Smith (1707–1783) of the First Church of Weymouth
          - Mary Smith (1741–1811), married Richard Cranch (1726–1811)
            - William Cranch (1769-1855), federal judge, married Nancy Greenleaf (1772-1843), sister of James Greenleaf, land speculator responsible for the development of Washington, D.C.
              - John Cranch (1807-1891), painter and print collector
              - Christopher Pearse Cranch (1813-1892), writer and artist
          - Abigail Smith (1744–1818), married John Adams (1735–1826), second president of the United States
            - Abigail Adams (1765–1813), "Nabby" married William Stephens Smith (1755–1816)
            - John Quincy Adams (1767–1848), sixth president of the United States, married Louisa Catherine Johnson (1775–1852)
              - Charles Francis Adams Sr. (1807–1886), married Abigail Brooks (1808–1889)
                - John Quincy Adams II (1833–1894), lawyer and politician
                - Charles Francis Adams Jr. (1835–1915), Civil War general, president of Union Pacific Railroad (1884–1890)
                  - Charles Francis Adams III (1866–1954), 44th Secretary of the Navy, mayor of Quincy, Massachusetts
                - Henry Brooks Adams (1838–1918), married Marian Hooper (1843–1885)
                - Mary Gardiner Adams (1845–1928), married Henry Parker Quincy (1838–1899)
            - Susanna Boylston Adams (1768–1770)
            - Charles Adams (1770–1800), married Sarah Smith
            - Thomas Boylston Adams (1772–1832), Massachusetts Representative, justice, married Ann Harrod
          - William Smith (1746–1787), married Catherine Louise Salmon (1749–1824)
          - Elizabeth Smith (1750–1815), married John Shaw (1748–1794), remarried to Stephen Peabody (1741–1819)
        - Lucy Quincy (1729–1785), married Cotton Tufts (1732–1815)
    - John Quincy (1652–1674)
    - Joanna Quincy (1654–1695), married Lieut. David Hobart (1651–1717) of Hingham
    - Judith Quincy (1655–1679), married John Rayner (1643–1676)
    - Ruth Quincy (1658–1698), married John Hunt
    - Edmund Quincy (1681–1737) III, married Dorothy Flynt (1678–1737)
      - Edmund Quincy (1703–1788) IV, married Elizabeth Wendell (1704–1769) partner with brother Josiah Quincy (1710–1784)
        - Edmund Quincy (1726–1782) V, businessman and land developer, married Anna Huske, remarried to Mehitabel Temple, remarried to Hannah Gannett
        - Henry Quincy (1727–1780), married Mary Salter, remarried to Eunice Newell
        - Abraham Quincy (1728–1756)
        - Elizabeth Quincy (1729–1770), married Samuel Sewall (1715–1771)
        - Katherine Quincy (b. 1733)
        - Dr. Jacob Quincy (1734–1773), married Elizabeth Williams
        - Sarah Quincy (1736–1790), married General William Greenleaf
        - Esther Quincy (1738–1810), married Jonathan Sewall (1728–1796), last royal attorney general of Massachusetts
        - Dorothy Quincy (1747–1830), married John Hancock (1737–1793), remarried to Captain James Scott (1746–1809)
      - Elizabeth Quincy (1706–1746), married John Wendell (1703–1762)
      - Dorothy Quincy (1709–1762), "Dorothy Q" of Oliver Wendell Holmes Jr., married Edward Jackson (1707–1757), Boston merchant and manufacturer
        - Mary Jackson (1740–1804), married Oliver Wendell (1733–1818)
          - Sarah Wendell married the Reverend Abiel Holmes (1763–1837)
            - Oliver Wendell Holmes Sr. (1809–1894), married Amelia Lee Jackson
              - Oliver Wendell Holmes Jr. (1841–1935), jurist
        - Jonathan Jackson (1743–1810), merchant and Continental Congress delegate from Massachusetts, married Sarah Barnard (d. 1770), remarried to Hannah Tracy (d. 1797)
          - Edward Jackson (1768–1777)
          - Henry Jackson (1774–1806), married Hannah Swett (1774–1850)
          - Charles Jackson (1775–1855), married Amelia Lee(d. 1808), remarried to Frances Cabot
            - Amelia Lee Jackson (d. 1888), married Oliver Wendell Holmes Sr. (1809–1894)
          - Hannah Jackson, married Francis Cabot Lowell (1775–1817)
          - Sarah Jackson, married John Gardner (1770–1825)
          - Dr. James Jackson (1777–1867), married Elizabeth Cabot, remarried to Sarah Cabot
          - Patrick Tracy Jackson (1780–1847), married Lydia Cabot
      - Colonel Josiah Quincy I (1710–1784), Revolutionary War soldier, built the Josiah Quincy House, married Hanna Sturgis (1712–1755), remarried to Elizabeth Waldron (1722–1760), remarried to Ann Marsh (1723–1805)
        - Edmund Quincy (1733–1768), Boston merchant died at sea in West Indies
          - Benjamin Quincy (1767-1856) Married Sarah Sally Hammond (1770-1862) m.1/1/1793.
            - Hannah L Quincy (1793-1866) Married Henry Clark "Harry" Hollembeak (1787-1867) m. 1810
              - John William Hollembeak (1833-1913) Married Hannah Lewton (1836-1908) m. 1853
                - Asa Herbert Hollembeak (1869-1927) Married Sadie Mae Puckett (1878-1943) m 1894
                  - Hannah Marguerite Hollembeak (1894-1941) Married Richard A Trafton (1885-1966) m 1911
                    - Beatrice Marguerite Trafton (1914-2000) Married James Sinkler Jernigan (1909-1969) m. 1934
        - Samuel Quincy (1735–1789), attorney and barrister, solicitor general, loyalist exile, married Hannah Hill (1734–1782) who was a revolutionary and stayed in Massachusetts during her husband's exile, remarried to Mary Ann Chadwell
        - Hannah Quincy (1736–1826), "Orlinda" of John Adams diaries, married Bela Lincoln (1734–1773), Hingham physician, brother of General Benjamin Lincoln; remarried to Ebenezer Storer (1730–1807), deacon of Brattle Street Church and treasurer of Harvard College
        - Josiah Quincy II (1744–1775), attorney, "the Patriot", newspaper propagandist, died at sea returning from mission to London, married Abigail Phillips (1745–1798), daughter of William Phillips Sr. (1722–1804)
          - Josiah Quincy III (1772–1864), president of Harvard University (1829–1845), U.S. Representative (1805–1813), mayor of Boston (1823–1828), married Eliza Susan Morton (1773–1850)
            - Eliza Susan Quincy (1798–1884), eldest of "five articulate sisters", artist, archivist and historian
            - Josiah Quincy Jr. (1802–1882), mayor of Boston (1846–1848), built the Josiah Quincy Mansion, married Mary Jane Miller (1806–1874)
              - Josiah Phillips Quincy (1829–1910), poet, writer, publicist, married Helen Frances Huntington (1831–1903)
                - Josiah Quincy (1859–1919), General Court representative, assistant secretary of the Navy, mayor of Boston (1895–1899), married Ellen Krebs Tyler (1862–1904)
                  - Edmund Quincy (1903–1997), artist
                - Helen Quincy (b. 1861)
                - Frances Huntington Quincy (1870–1933), essayist and author, married Mark Antony DeWolfe Howe (1864–1960)
                  - Quincy Howe (1900–1977), news analyst, author
                  - Helen Huntington Howe (1905–1975), monologuist, novelist, married Reginald Allen
                  - Mark DeWolfe Howe (1906–1967), Harvard law professor, historian, biographer, civil rights leader
                - Mabel Quincy
                - Violet Quincy
              - Samuel Miller Quincy (1833–1887), lawyer, historian, Civil War soldier, and 28th mayor of New Orleans (May 5, 1865 – June 8, 1865)
              - Mary Apthorp Quincy (1834–1883), married Benjamin Apthorp Gould
                - Susan Quincy Gould (b. 1862)
                - Lucretia Gould (b. 1864)
                - Alice Bache Gould (b. 1868)
                - Benjamin Apthorp Gould (b. 1870)
                - Maria Gould (b. 1872)
            - Abigail Phillips Quincy (1803–1893), last Quincy to occupy the Josiah Quincy House
            - Maria Sophia Quincy (1805–1886)
            - Margaret Morton Quincy (1806–1882), married Benjamin Daniel Greene (1793–1862), traveler and botanist
            - Edmund Quincy (1808–1877), diarist, lecturer, author, abolitionist, married Lucilla Pinckney Parker (1810–1860), daughter of prominent Boston merchant Daniel Pinckney Parker
              - Edmund Quincy (1834–1894), civil engineer
              - Henry Parker Quincy (1838–1899), Harvard MD, "anatomical draughtsman", married Mary Gardiner Adams (1845–1928)
              - Mary Quincy (b. 1841)
            - Anna Cabot Lowell Quincy (1812–1899), youngest of the "articulate sisters", married Robert Cassie Waterston (1812–1899), Boston clergyman who gave his library to the Massachusetts Historical Society
        - Elizabeth Quincy (1757–1825), married Benjamin Guild (1749–1792)
        - Ann Quincy (1763–1844), married Asa Packard (1758–1843)
    - John Quincy (b.1683)
    - Mary Quincy (1684–1716), married Daniel Baker (1686–1731)
