= Edmund Quincy (1703–1788) =

American merchant (1703–1788)

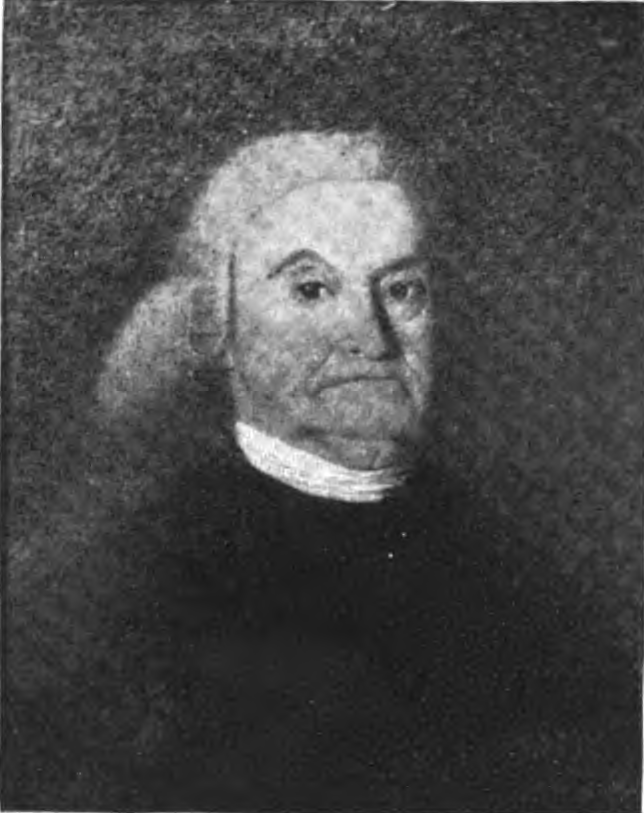
- Born: 1703
- Died: 1788 (aged 84–85)
- Spouse(s): Elizabeth Wendell
- Children: 9, including Dorothy Quincy
- Parent(s): Edmund Quincy; Dorothy Flynt

Edmund Quincy IV (/ˈkwɪnzi/; 1703–1788) was an American merchant active in Boston during the 18th century.

== Early life and career ==
Coat of Arms of Edmund Quincy IV

Edmund Quincy was one of four children born to Edmund Quincy III (1681–1737) and Dorothy Flynt Quincy of Braintree (now Quincy) and Boston. He graduated from Harvard College in 1722, and went into the commerce and shipbuilding business with his younger brother Josiah and brother-in-law Edward Jackson. In 1748, the Bethell, a merchant ship they owned, took out a letter of marque to protect itself from Spanish privateers during King George's War. Armed with fourteen guns and six fake wooden guns, the Bethell accidentally came upon a much larger and more heavily armed Spanish ship at night in the Atlantic Ocean. Unable to escape, the Bethell instead demanded that the Spanish ship surrender, and, mistaking the Bethell for a British sloop-of-war, it complied without a fight. The Spanish ship's cargo, consisting of 161 chests of silver, 2 of gold, and various valuable commodities, was brought safely back to Boston and valued at around one hundred thousand pounds sterling.

Josiah Quincy retired shortly after this windfall, while Edmund remained in business, entering into a partnership with his sons. Though well respected, he suffered financial reverses and was declared bankrupt in 1757. He later retired to his paternal estate and, in 1765, published A Treatise on Hemp Husbandry.

Quincy was also an acting magistrate of Suffolk County until the time of his death, and was referred to as "Squire" or "Justice" Quincy.

== Family and personal life ==
Quincy married Elizabeth Wendell in 1725. Together they had nine children, including Dorothy Quincy, who married John Hancock; Esther Quincy, who married Jonathan Sewall; and Elizabeth Quincy, who was the mother of Samuel Sewall. After his first wife's death in 1769, Quincy married Anna Gerrish. Quincy was also a Freemason, and was a member of Master's Lodge along with Richard Gridley.

Edmund Quincy died July 4, 1788, at the age of 85.

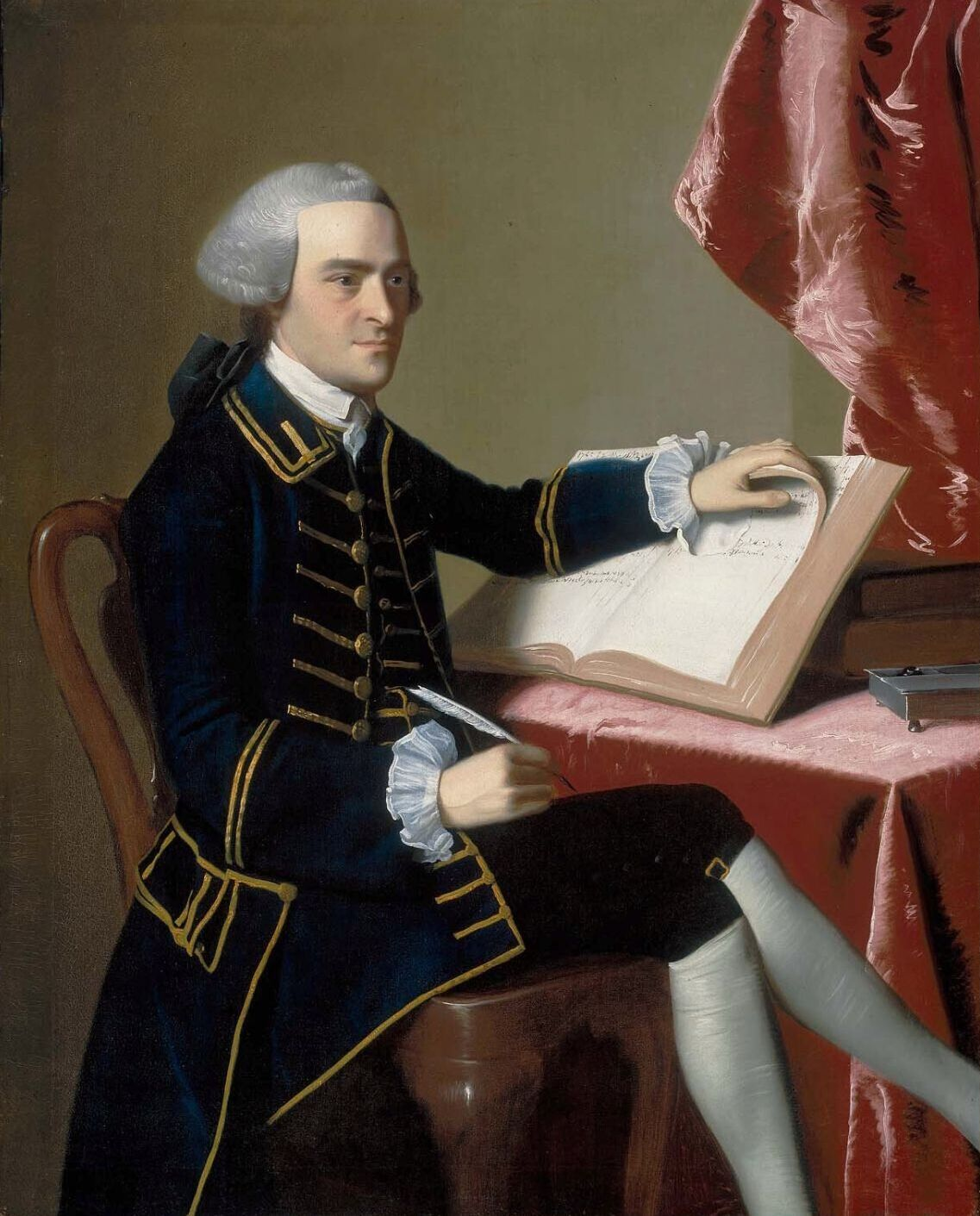
John Hancock

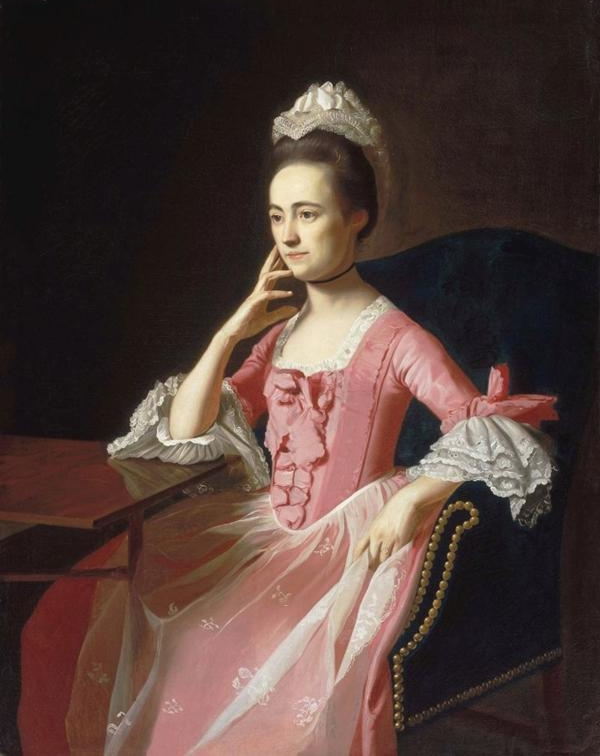
Dorothy (Quincy) Hancock

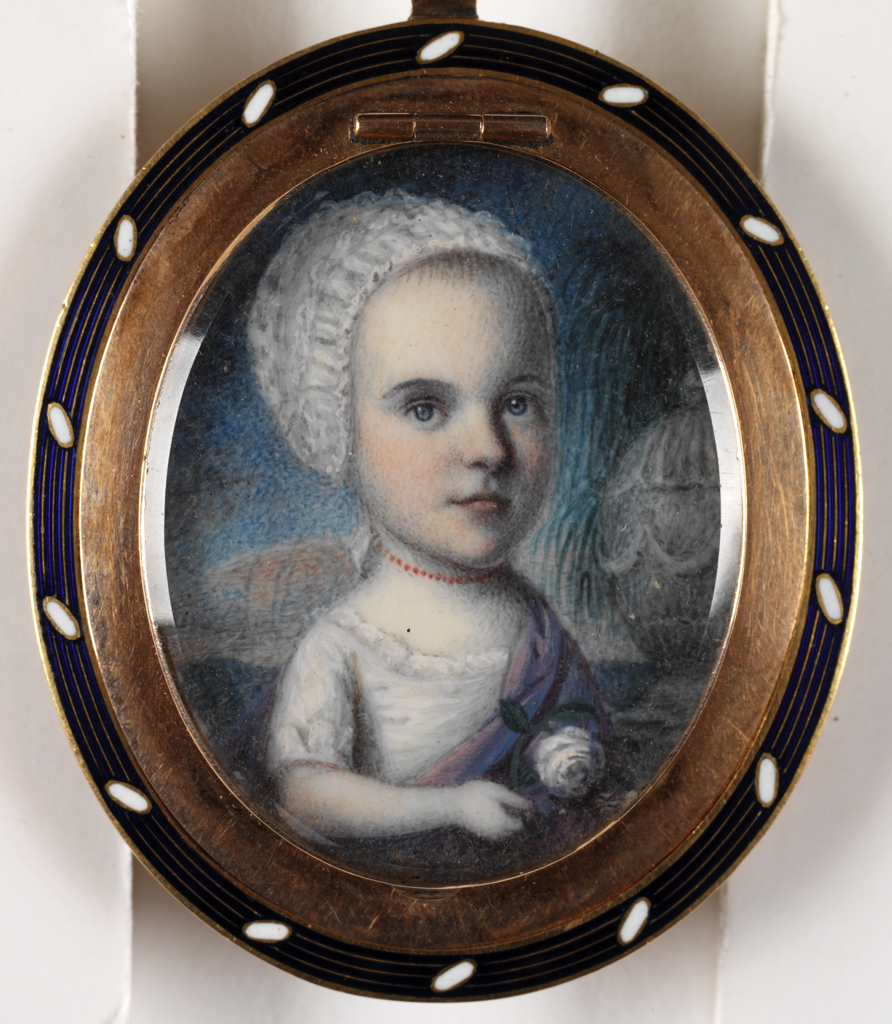
Lydia Henchman Hancock (1776–1777)

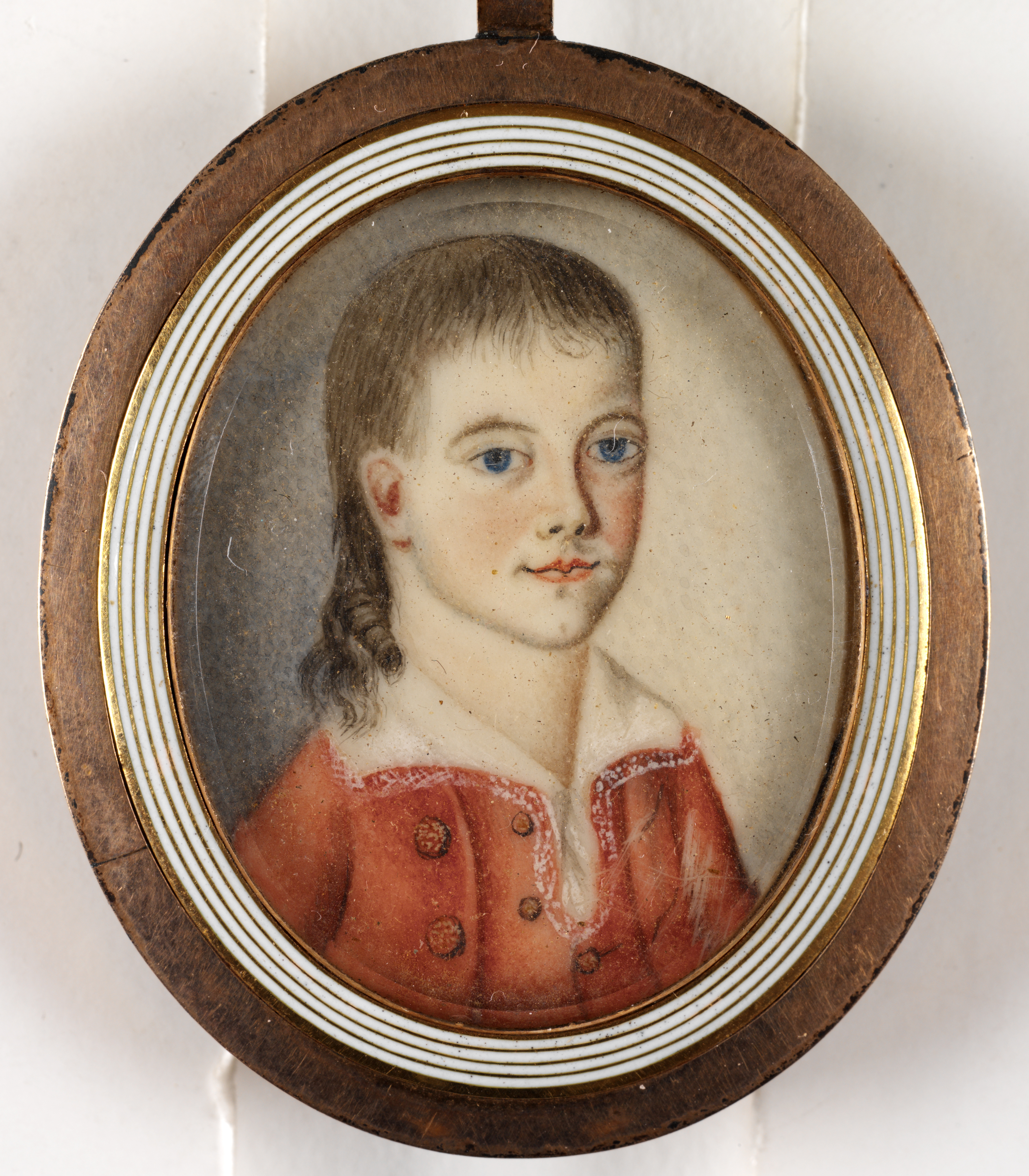
John George Washington Hancock (1778–1787)

== See also ==
- Quincy political family
