= Alice Bache Gould =

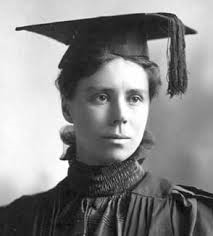
- As a young graduate
- Born: January 5, 1868; Cambridge, Massachusetts, U.S.
- Died: July 25, 1953 (aged 85); Simancas, Spain
- Education: Bryn Mawr College, Massachusetts Institute of Technology, Newnham College, Cambridge, University of Chicago
- Known for: Columbus' "crew list" (tripulantes)
- Awards: Cross of Alfonso the Wise (1924); Election to the Spanish Royal Academy of History (1942); Order of Isabella the Catholic (1952)
- Scientific career
- Fields: Historian
- Doctoral advisor: E. H. Moore in mathematics, but she never completed the thesis or received the degree.

Alice Bache Gould (January 5, 1868 – July 25, 1953) was an American mathematician, philanthropist, and historian, who spent much of her time in Puerto Rico, South America and Spain. She was impelled in that direction by her family's sometime residence in Argentina during her childhood, where her father held a responsible position as an astronomer.

Sent home for her education, Bache Gould trained as a mathematician and undertook graduate studies in mathematics, teaching for a time at Carleton College, Minnesota. Enrolled at MIT, she failed to complete her thesis and obtain the PhD, due to poor health. Finding work as a mathematician subsequently proved difficult.

Being fluent in Spanish, she began subsequently to follow her true interest in Spanish-American studies, working for several years in the educational system of Puerto Rico. She abandoned mathematics for history and began to do research on the colonization of the Americas by Spain. World War I found her doing research in Madrid, where she promptly volunteered for war work at the American Embassy there, and, sent home, in the United States. Subsequently, she found her way back to Spain, where she remained, doing research and publishing articles and a book on Agassiz. When the Spanish Civil War started, she retired to the United States, returning when it was over for the peak of her career.

As a historian, her studies of Christopher Columbus and Queen Isabella I of Castile resulted in the most complete biographical account of Columbus' crew. In 1942, Gould became the only female corresponding member of Real Academia de la Historia and was awarded the Order of Isabella the Catholic (in 1952). Previously she had received other honors.

Gould never married or had any children. She had close relationships with a few female friends, carried on mainly by correspondence. There is no evidence of any sexual involvement with either sex. One friend joked about the low-cut dresses she wore to Puerto Rico. As a researcher in Spain she was a highly respected aging unmarried lady with greying hair.

== Early life and education ==
Alice Bache Gould was born on January 5, 1868, in Cambridge, Massachusetts, to Benjamin Apthorp Gould (1824-1896) and Mary Apthorp Quincy Gould (1834-1883). Her mother was part of the Quincy political family and a descendant of Rev. George Phillips who settled Watertown, Massachusetts in 1630. Her father, an astronomer, headed the Argentine National Observatory. Alice lived briefly with her family in Cordoba, Argentina before being sent back to Cambridge in 1871, to live with relatives. Alice lived mainly in the United States but frequently traveled to Argentina. Tragically, while on a birthday trip to the River Rio Primero on February 8, 1874, her older sisters Susan Morton Quincy Gould and Lucretia Goddard Gould and their nurse Alvina Fontaine were swept away and drowned. Alice and her younger siblings Mary and Benjamin were unable to help. In 1883, Alice Bache Gould suffered a further loss when her mother died. Her father finally returned from Argentina in 1885.

Gould studied briefly at the Society for the Collegiate Instruction of Women in Cambridge (later Radcliffe College) in 1885, before attending Bryn Mawr College from 1886 to 1889. One of her close friends was Emily Greene Balch. She graduated from Bryn Mawr as a member of the school's second graduating class in 1889 with her A.B. in mathematics and physics. She went on to study at Massachusetts Institute of Technology and at Newnham College, Cambridge in England from 1890 to 1893. Although Newnham allowed women to attend classes, it did not yet grant them degrees. After teaching briefly at Carleton College in Northfield, Minnesota, she became a graduate student in mathematics at the University of Chicago in 1894, studying with E. H. Moore. However, her father's death in 1896, the end of her fellowship, and poor health, prevented her from completing her thesis on Brocardian geometry, a type of geometry developed by Henri Brocard. She returned to Cambridge to recover her health.

On November 17, 1897, Alice fulfilled one of her father's ambitions by donating $20,000 to the National Academy of Sciences for the Benjamin Apthorp Gould Fund to support researchers and "advance the science of astronomy". The New York Times identified it at the time as "one of the largest funds in the country".

== Puerto Rico ==
In 1901, Gould published a historical monograph on Louis Agassiz in Mark Antony De Wolfe Howe's series of Beacon Biographies of Eminent Americans. She was commended for her descriptions of Agassiz's personality and the Brazilian landscapes.

In 1903 Gould traveled to Puerto Rico, where she spent much of the next seven years. Gould started a "Porto Rico Teachers' Fund" to raise money for a nursing school around 1905. She was also a contributor to the Kissinger Relief Fund for the study of yellow fever in 1907, and was approached by Bailey K. Ashford about supporting a Puerto Rican school of tropical medicine. Later in life, between 1941 and 1947, Gould donated approximately 1,500 items on Puerto Rico to the United States Library of Congress.

== Spain and the new world ==
During her stay in South America, Gould became interested in the colonization of the Americas, and began to write an article on the early colonization of Barbados. In 1911, she went to Spain, stopping to do research on Christopher Columbus and Queen Isabella I of Castile at the Archivo de Simancas and other Spanish archives. She spent much of the rest of her life there.

=== World War I ===
During World War I Gould went to the United States Embassy in Madrid where she volunteered in the espionage office. She led an effort to send female clerical workers to the embassy to assist staff there. In March 1918, she returned to Boston, expecting to remain there for only a few months. When she realized that she would not be able to return to Spain for some time, she tried to obtain war work in the United States that would allow her to use her mathematical training. Few options were available, but she eventually had the choice of assisting Forest Ray Moulton at the Ordnance Department in Washington, D.C., doing "routine and monotonous" work as a "computer", or helping her former advisor, E. H. Moore, to teach classes in navigation to Naval ROTC students at the University of Chicago. She chose to work with Moore, and enjoyed being useful to the war effort. She became particularly interested in the mathematical techniques of great-circle navigation, and began to write her own text on the subject. By 1919, she was no longer needed at the University of Chicago. She did not complete her proposed text.

=== Columbian researches ===
Gould's first published paper on Spanish colonization of the Americas appeared in the Boletín de la Real Academia de la Historia (the Bulletin of the Spanish Royal Academy of History) in 1924. In 1925, she returned to Spain to continue her Columbian researches. Over the next 42 years, the results of her research were predominantly published there. In 1984, those publications were collected and republished as Nueva lista documentada de los tripulantes de Colon 1492.

=== Spanish Civil War ===
During the Spanish Civil War in 1936 Gould returned briefly to Boston. During this stay in Boston she supported another philanthropic cause. In 1937, she was a major contributor when the historical Josiah Quincy House became the property of the Society for the Preservation of New England Antiquities. After the Spanish civil war, Gould again returned to Spain.

=== Cristóbal Colón and his men ===
As a result of her researches, Gould was able to specifically identify the crew members who accompanied Columbus on his transatlantic voyage in 1492, to describe them and their historical situation in detail, and to correct a number of historical errors. Gould's articles identified 87 of the 90 crewmen. Her studies showed that only four of the Columbus crew had problems with the law, destroying the version that most of them were criminals and jailbirds. She also demonstrated that no Englishman, Irishman or other North European was aboard the Columbus ships. and proved that Pedro de Lepe, whose existence had long been disputed, had sailed with Columbus on the Santa María. Gould found a certified copy of the document that recognized Columbus's descendants rights to his privileges, and was praised particularly for ability to read the penmanship of the court scribes. She is credited with saving documents that would otherwise have been discarded and destroyed.

Samuel Eliot Morison, who won the Pulitzer Prize for his biography of Christopher Columbus, Admiral of the Ocean Sea (1942), described Gould as follows: a "distinguished, gray-haired lady, dressed usually in black bombazine with a vintage hat, striding resolutely into the Archive of the Indies to find some document for me that the archivist insisted did not exist." He strongly praised her scholarship, which he considered "the most valuable piece of Columbian research in the present [20th] century."

== Awards ==
In 1942, Gould became the only female corresponding member of Real Academia de la Historia. In 1947, she became an honorary member of the Colonial Society of Massachusetts, the first woman to be accepted into membership. In 1952, she was awarded the Order of Isabella the Catholic, presented in Seville by Joaquin Ruiz Jimenez, the Spanish Minister of Education.

== Later life ==
Six years before her death, Gould collapsed of sunstroke in the street, and was told to spend less time working. Gould died of a cerebral hemorrhage on July 25, 1953, in the garden at Simancas Castle, near the archives. Being of Congregationalist Protestant extraction, she is interred in the English Cemetery of Madrid, which is reserved for non-Catholics. A stone book on her grave is inscribed with her name.

After her death, a plaque was placed at the entryway to honor "Miss Alice B. Gould illustrious North American researcher and a great friend of Spain. She worked in this archive for forty years and died at its entrance on the 25 of July 1953”. The original Spanish reads: "A miss Alice B. Gould, ilustre investigadora norteamericana y gran amiga de España. trabajó en este archivo durante cuarenta años y murió a su entrada el día 25 de julio de 1953". A street in Simancas, Spain was named after her (Calle Alicia B. Gould).

== Works ==
Gould's papers and collected materials are contained in a number of archives, including the Massachusetts Historical Society, the United States Library of Congress, the Elmer Holmes Bobst Library in New York City, and the Spanish Royal Academy of History.

- "Obras de Gould, Alice Bache, 1868-1953 (14)" (in Spanish). Biblioteca Virtual Miguel de Cervantes.
- Gould, Alice Bache (1919). "The adventure of the missing fortnight". The Atlantic Monthly. 124 (1): 34–44.
