= Daniel Quincy =

Silversmith

Daniel Quincy (1651-1690)
- Born: 1651; Braintree, Massachusetts
- Died: 1690 (aged 38–39); Boston, Massachusetts
- Resting place: Granary Burial Ground Hull Tomb
- Occupations: Goldsmith, Merchant
- Spouse: Anna Shephard
- Children: Ann Quincy Holman (1685-1717); John Quincy
- Parent(s): Edmund Quincy II, Joanna Hoar Quincy
- Relatives: Quincy political family

Daniel Quincy (1651 – 1690) trained as a silversmith under John Hull, his uncle by marriage (Judith Quincy Hull). Daniel lived with John and Judith Hull from the age of seven and was trained in the Hull and Sanderson mint on Summer Street (Boston) as a goldsmith producing the pine tree shilling. Hull treated young Daniel as his own son. Daniel and Ann Quincy were married by John Hull Esq.

"The brother of Mrs. Judith Hull, Col. Edmund Quincy II, lived, and was a member of the church, at Braintree. His first wife was Joanna Hoar, sister of Leonard Hoar, the person who came over from England in 1672, preached some time as assistant to Thomas Thacher (minister) at the Old South Church and was then elected President of Harvard College. He had been educated at that College, where his name appears among the graduates of 1650. In that same year, his sister, Mrs. Joanna Quinsey, became the mother of Daniel Quinsey, who was afterwards placed as an apprentice with his uncle, John Hull, who was a gold smith, and some years afterwards Treasurer of the Province, and the contractor for the coinage of the celebrated pine-tree shillings. In 1650, Mrs. Joanna Quinsey died; and her husband afterwards married Elizabeth Gookin."

He was the grandfather of Elizabeth Quincy Smith and great grandfather of Abigail Smith Adams; first Second Lady of the United States and second First Lady of the United States, who was born on December 17, 1721, in Braintree, Norfolk, Massachusetts. She was the daughter of Colonel John Quincy (July 21, 1689 – July 13, 1767), an American soldier, politician and member of the Quincy political family. Daniel Quincy is in Hull's Tomb.
