= Quincy Mansion =

Coordinates: 42.272°N 71.012°W

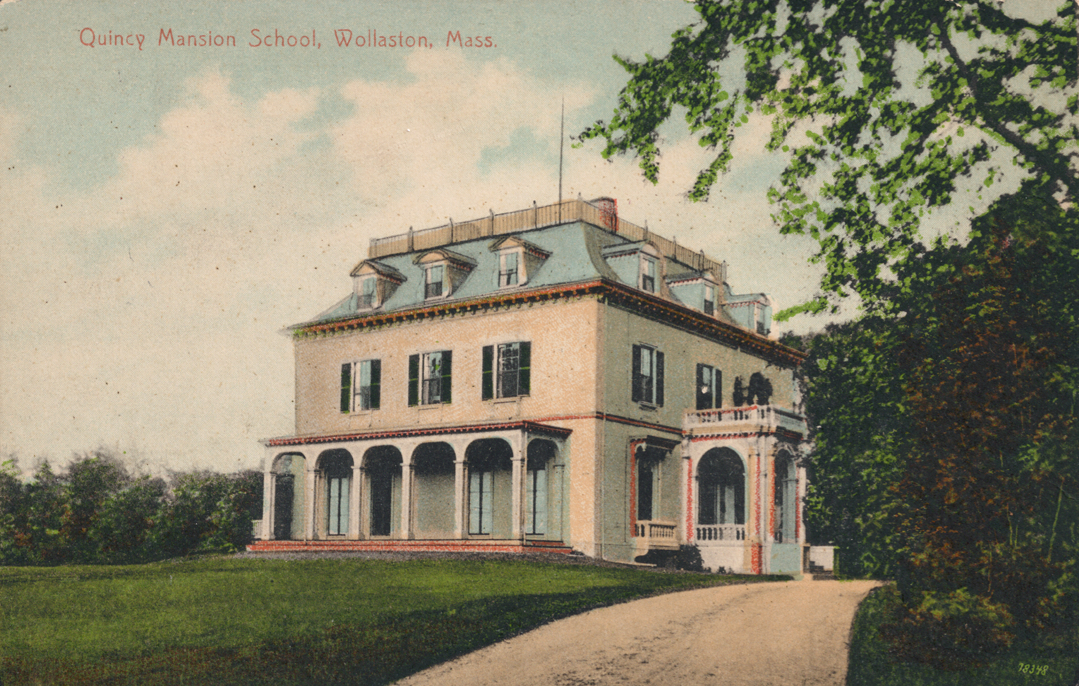
An early 20th-century postcard of the Quincy mansion.

The Quincy Mansion /ˈkwɪnzi/, also known as the Josiah Quincy Mansion, was a summer home built by Josiah Quincy Jr. in 1848. The mansion itself was situated where Angell Hall now stands on the campus of the Eastern Nazarene College. The mansion, once a Quincy, Massachusetts landmark, was demolished in 1969.

== Architecture ==
The mansion, which was built in the mid-19th century, was three stories and white, in Georgian architecture, with marble fireplaces in most of the rooms and large French windows on the first floor that "opened upon either little balconies or broad piazzas." From the captain's walk of the Mansion, Wollaston Bay was clearly visible down to the "ships entering and leaving the port of Boston."

== Ownership ==
=== Quincy family ===
The mansion was once located, along with the Josiah Quincy House and the Dorothy Quincy House on a 200-acre (0.81 km^{2}) parcel of land known as the "Lower Farm" belonging to the Quincy family. It was built by Josiah Quincy Jr., then-mayor of Boston, c. 1848. Elm Avenue, with its four rows of elms, had been the avenue, or driveway, for the Josiah Quincy House and the Josiah Quincy Mansion.

=== Quincy Mansion School ===
The property eventually came under the ownership of Horace Mann Willard, who established the Quincy Mansion School for Girls, a Christian, college-preparatory, and boarding school, and became principal. When Dr. Willard died in 1907, his wife took over as principal until she could no longer manage the property.

=== Eastern Nazarene College ===
At the urging of Charles J. Fowler, who knew the property was for sale, the Eastern Nazarene College moved to its current location in the Wollaston Park area of Quincy, Massachusetts, in 1919, and acquired the mansion as part of a 12-acre (49,000 m^{2}) property that also included the classroom building called the Manchester (1896), the stables (1848) (where Memorial Hall was built in 1948), and the Canterbury (1901), which still stands today as Canterbury Hall.

The mansion, which had seen many uses and was need of costly repair, was instead torn down in 1969, three years after the creation of the National Register of Historic Places but before local buildings such as the Josiah Quincy House had been placed on it.

== See also ==
- Josiah Quincy House
- Quincy Homestead
- Quincy family
- Eastern Nazarene College
