= Josiah Quincy II =

American lawyer and patriot (1744–1775)

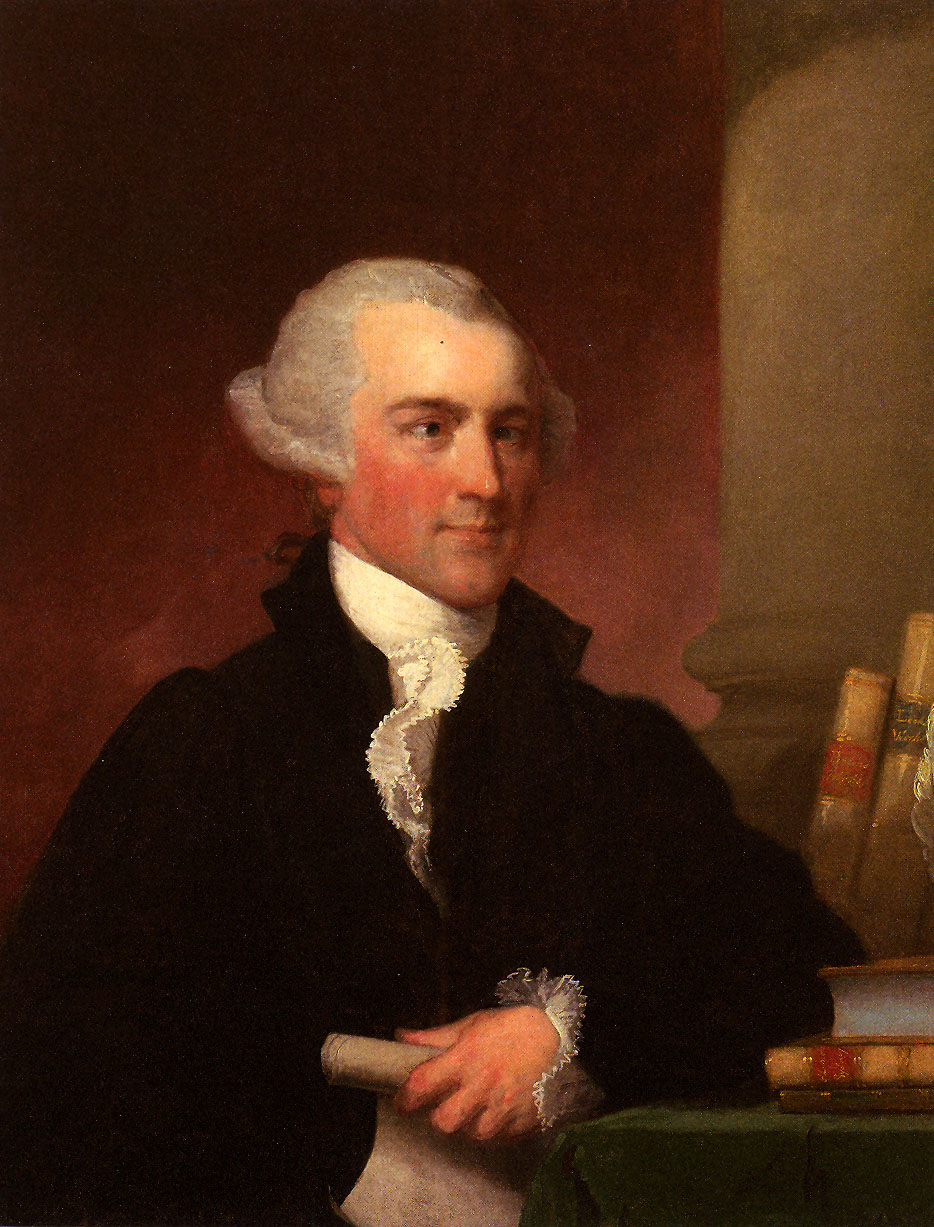
- Posthumous portrait by Gilbert Stuart, c. 1825
- Born: February 23, 1744; Boston, Massachusetts
- Died: April 26, 1775 (aged 31); North Atlantic Ocean
- Education: Harvard College
- Occupation: Lawyer
- Spouse: Abigail Phillips
- Relatives: Quincy family

Josiah Quincy II (/ˈkwɪnzi/; February 23, 1744 – April 26, 1775) was an American lawyer and patriot. He was a principal spokesman for the Sons of Liberty in Boston prior to the Revolution and was John Adams' co-counsel during the trials of Captain Thomas Preston and the soldiers involved in the Boston Massacre.

== Early life ==
Quincy was born in Boston in 1744 to Colonel Josiah Quincy I and Hannah Sturgis Quincy. In 1756, shortly after the death of his mother, he moved with his father and other siblings to their ancestral homestead in Braintree.

Quincy was the father of the Harvard president and Boston mayor Josiah Quincy III. He was a descendant of Edmund Quincy, who emigrated to Massachusetts in 1633. His first cousin once removed was Dorothy Quincy, wife of Governor John Hancock. He was also a distant relative of John Quincy Adams through the sixth President's mother, Abigail Smith Adams.

In 1763, he graduated from Harvard College and began studying law in the office of Oxenbridge Thacher (died 1765), a top Boston attorney, whose practice he would take over in 1765. A gifted orator, in 1766 he delivered an impassioned address in English "on liberty," or as others would recall it, on the meaning of being "a patriot," at Harvard's commencement upon receiving his Masters. The speech caught the attention of Boston's patriot leadership, and by 1767, he was contributing regularly to Samuel Adams' Boston Gazette.

== Career ==
Published initially under the name "Hyperion", his essays were notable for their colorful rhetoric and denouncement of British oppression.

On February 12, 1770, he published in the Gazette a call to his countrymen "to break off all social intercourse with those whose commerce contaminates, whose luxuries poison, whose avarice is insatiable, and whose unnatural oppressions are not to be borne."

He used the signatures Mentor, Callisthenes, Marchmont Needham, Edward Sexby, &c., in later letters to the Boston Gazette.

After the Boston Massacre (March 5, 1770) he and John Adams defended Captain Preston and the accused soldiers and secured their acquittal. Prosecuting the case were Robert Treat Paine and Josiah's older brother Samuel Quincy, who shortly after was named solicitor general.

He traveled for his health in the South in 1773, and left in his journal an interesting account of his travels and of society in South Carolina; this journey was important in that it brought Southern patriots into closer relations with the popular leaders in Massachusetts.

Perhaps seeking to enhance his standing in advance of the selection of delegates to the First Continental Congress, in May 1774 he published Observations on the Act of Parliament, commonly called The Boston Port Bill, with Thoughts on Civil Society and Standing Armies, in which he urged patriots and heroes to form a compact for opposition and for vengeance.

In September 1774 he secretly left for England, where he argued the American cause to British politicians who were sympathetic to the colonies.

== Death ==
On March 16, 1775, he started back on the Boston Packet, but he died of tuberculosis on April 26, 1775 within sight of Gloucester.

== See also ==
- Quincy political family
