= Benjamin Guild =

American bookseller

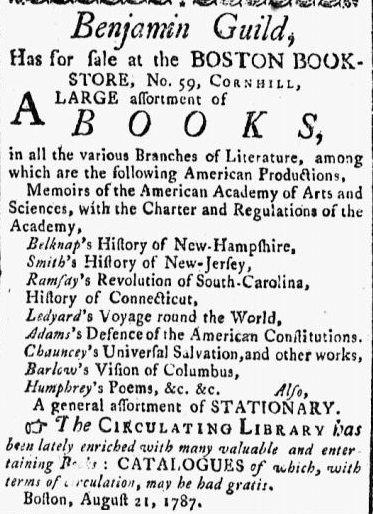
Advertisement for Benjamin Guild's Boston Book-Store, Cornhill, Boston, Massachusetts, 1787

Benjamin Guild (1749-1792) was a bookseller in Boston, Massachusetts, in the late 18th century. He ran the "Boston Book Store" and a circulating subscription library in the 1780s and 1790s at no.59 Cornhill, "first door south of the Old-Brick Meeting-House."

== Biography ==
Coat of Arms of Benjamin Guild

Born in 1749 to Benjamin Guild and Abigail Graves, Benjamin attended Harvard College (class of 1769); classmates included Theophilus Parsons, Alexander Scammel, Peter Thacher, William Tudor, and Peleg Wadsworth. He later tutored at Harvard, 1776-1780, and travelled abroad. In 1784 he married Betsey Quincy (1757-1825). (Note: Elizabeth Quincy was the daughter of Josiah Quincy I.) He served as a charter member and an officer of the American Academy of Arts and Sciences, and on the editorial committee of the Boston Magazine.

Guild sold books from his shop at no.8 State Street from around 1785 until 1786, when he moved to Cornhill (1786-1792). In addition to the bookshop, he ran a circulating library, one of the first in post-war Boston. The library contained "several thousands" of volumes, which, according to its 1787 newspaper advertisement "will furnish such a fund of amusement and information as cannot fail to entertain every class of readers ... whether solitary or social -- political or professional -- serious or gay." Subscribers paid eight dollars per year, or "two dollars per quarter -- to have the liberty of taking out two books at a time and no more -- to change them as often as the subscriber pleases -- and no book to be retained longer than one month." Guild stipulated that "any book lost, abused, leaves folded down, writ upon or torn, must be paid for." After his death in 1792, Guild's bookshop and library were taken over by William P. Blake.

Among the titles in Guild's circulating library in 1789:

- Addison's Works
- Algerine Spy in Pennsylvania
- Robert Bage's Barham Downs, a novel
- Countess de Genlis' Adelaide and Theodore
- Madame de Lafayette's Zayde, a Spanish History
- Raynal's Revolution in America
- John Rice's Art of Reading
- Robin's New Travels in America
- Baron de Tott's memoirs of the Turkish Empire
- Nathaniel Wanley's Wonders
- Wraxall's Tour
- Wyld's Practical Surveyor
- Wynne's History of America
- Yorrick's Sentimental Journey
- Zimmerman's Political Survey of Europe

== See also ==
- List of booksellers in Boston

== Bibliography ==
- An addition to a catalogue of a large assortment of books ... to be let or sold by Benjamin Guild at the Boston Book Store, no.59 Cornhill, Boston, 1788
- New select catalogue of Benjamin's Guild's circulating library ... at the Boston Book-Store, Boston: Benjamin Guild, 1789
- Charles Burleigh (1887), Genealogy and history of the Guild, Guile, and Gile family, Portland, Maine: Brown Thurston, p. 85
- Charles K. Bolton (1907), "Circulating libraries in Boston, 1765-1865", Publications of the Colonial Society of Massachusetts, vol. 11, p. 196+, hdl:2027/hvd.32044013656434 – via HathiTrust
- Jesse Shera (1949), "Foundations of the public library: the origins of the public library movement in New England, 1629-1855", University of Chicago Studies in Library Science, p. 137+, ISBN 9781406706512
