= Dorothy Quincy Homestead =

Historic house in Massachusetts, United States

- Quincy Homestead
- U.S. National Register of Historic Places
- U.S. National Historic Landmark
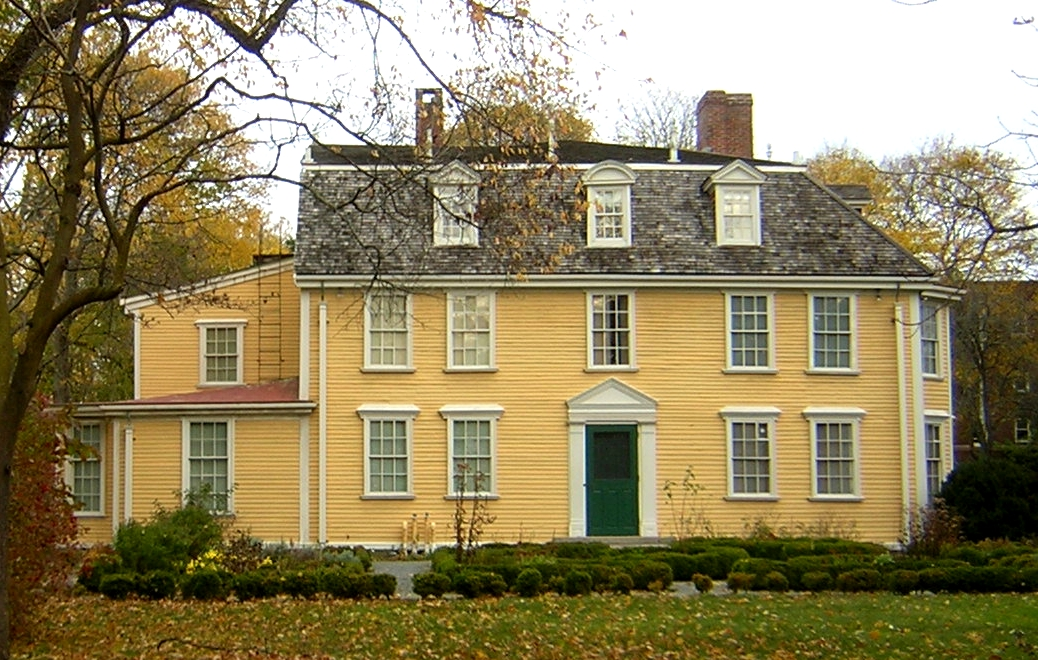

- Location within Massachusetts Location within the United States
- Location: 34 Butler Road, Quincy, Massachusetts
- Coordinates: 42°15′29.5″N 71°00′26.8″W
- Area: 1.7 acres (0.69 ha)
- Built: 1686
- NRHP reference No.: 70000095
- Added to NRHP: July 1, 1970

The Dorothy Quincy Homestead /ˈkwɪnzi/ is a National Historic Landmark at 34 Butler Road in Quincy, Massachusetts. The house was originally built in 1686, by Edmund Quincy II, who had an extensive property upon which there were multiple buildings. Today, the site consists of the Dorothy Quincy Homestead, which has been preserved as a museum and is open occasionally to the public.

== History ==
The original property covered approximately 200 acres (81 ha) extending from its present location to Quincy Bay and included the Dorothy Quincy House (1686), the Josiah Quincy House (1770), and the Josiah Quincy Mansion (1848). The Josiah Quincy Mansion, located on the property purchased by the Eastern Nazarene College in 1919, was torn down in 1969.

The Quincy family was one of the leading families of Massachusetts in from the 17th century to the 19th century. Descendants included several prominent Edmund Quincys and Josiah Quincys, and John Quincy Adams by virtue of his mother, American First Lady Abigail Adams. They settled in what is now Quincy in the 1630s.

The present Homestead was initially built by Edmund Quincy II. It became a meeting place for many American Revolutionary War patriots such as John Adams, Colonel John Quincy, and John Hancock. It was the childhood home of the first First Lady of Massachusetts, Dorothy Quincy Hancock Scott, wife of John Hancock.

== Preservation ==
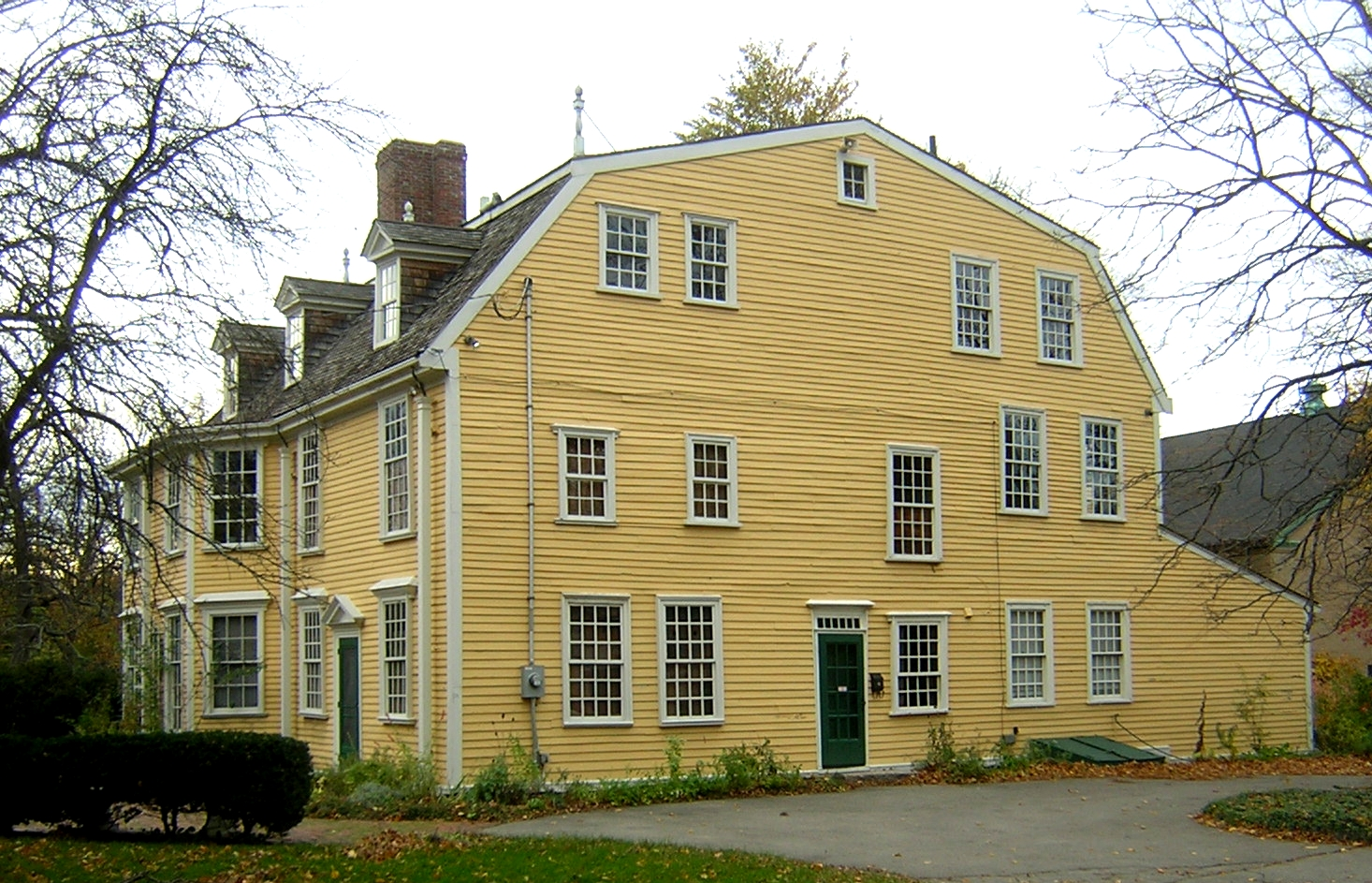

Showcasing the evolution of over three centuries of architecture in the Americas, the house features distinct design elements of the Colonial, Georgian, and Victorian style eras. It is one of the rare Massachusetts examples in which the elements of a 17th-century building are still clearly visible although surrounded by later styles. In 2005, the Quincy Homestead was designated a National Historic Landmark.

The Homestead is owned by the Commonwealth of Massachusetts and operated by The National Society of the Colonial Dames of America in a public-private partnership. In 1904, when the property was threatened by encroaching urban development, a citizen drive was established to save the mansion. Led by the Massachusetts Colonial Dames and Charles Francis Adams, Jr., the grandson of President John Quincy Adams, Quincy residents raised funds to assist the Dames in purchasing the estate and creating a distinctive house museum. Looking to the long-term protection and presentation of the property, the Colonial Dames then negotiated a sale-leaseback agreement with the Commonwealth, whereby the Commonwealth accepted responsibility for capital improvements and the exterior preservation of the house, and the Dames agreed to maintain the interior of the home, to beautify it with period furniture and decorative arts, and to interpret its history to the public. This relationship has continued for over a century.

Since 2005, the Dorothy Quincy Homestead has undergone a comprehensive exterior renovation to restore this stately historic building to its former grandeur. The project has included painting the structure, re-glazing the windows, and other major improvements.

== Gallery ==
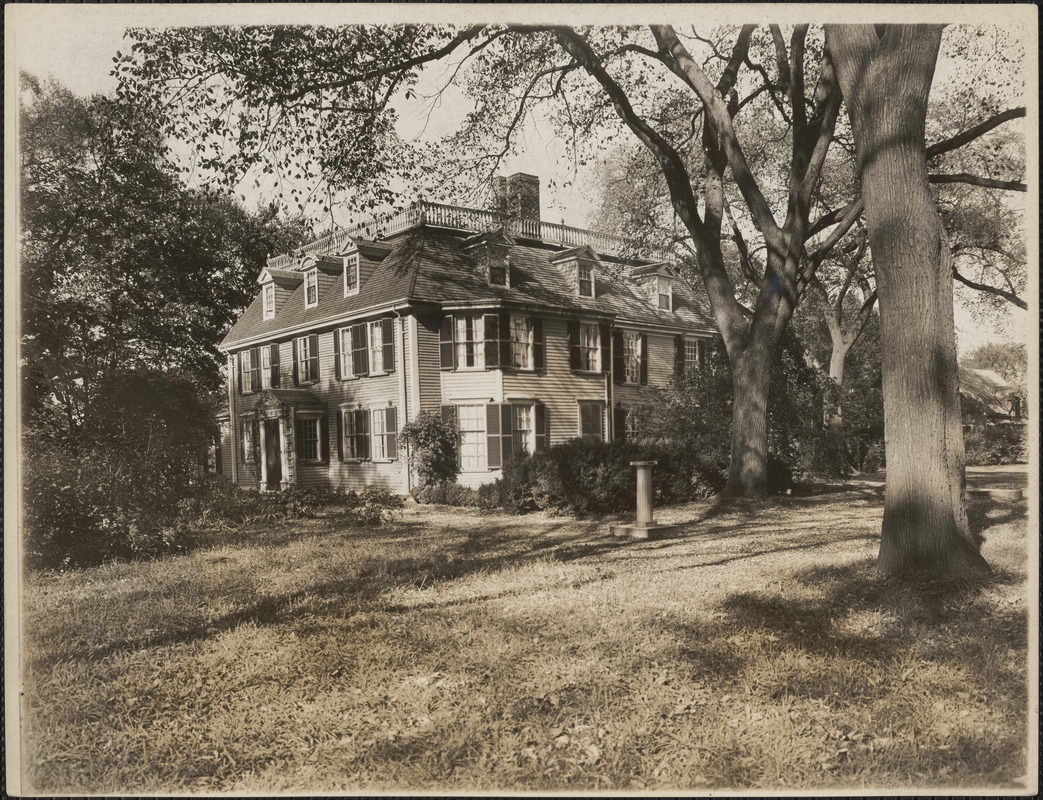
"Dorothy Q" House, old Quincy Mansion, Quincy, Mass.

== See also ==
- Quincy Mansion
- Josiah Quincy House
- Quincy family
- List of the oldest buildings in Massachusetts
- List of National Historic Landmarks in Massachusetts
- National Register of Historic Places listings in Quincy, Massachusetts
