= Edmund Quincy (1628–1698) =

17th-century English colonist in Massachusetts

Edmund Quincy III
- Coat of Arms of Edmund Quincy II
- Born: 1628; England
- Died: 1698
- Other names: Edmund Quincy III
- Occupations: Soldier; planter; politician; merchant
- Title: Colonel
- Spouses: Joanna Hoar, Elizabeth Gookin
- Children: 12 (including Edmund Quincy III)
- Parent(s): Edmund Quincy I Judith Pares

Edmund Quincy III (/ˈkwɪnzi/; 1628–1698) was an English colonist soldier, planter, politician, and merchant in the American colonies. He emigrated to the Massachusetts Bay Colony in 1633 with his father, Edmund Quincy I.

== Early life ==
Edmund Quincy II was born in England in 1628. He was the son of Edmund Quincy I. In 1633, at around five years old, he emigrated to colonial Massachusetts with his father.

== Career ==
Edmund became a magistrate, a representative to the general court, and a Lieutenant Colonel in a Massachusetts militia regiment. In 1689 he was a member of the provisional government (Committee of Safety). This was a time of turmoil in the colonies and England. The disliked Governor Edmund Andros of the Dominion of New England was placed under investigation by the Committee, while in England the Glorious Revolution (James II fled to France) and the Bill of Rights brought fundamental changes to the political structure. Colonel Quincy started work on the family property, called the Quincy Homestead, around 1696.

== Personal life ==
His mother Judith Pares Quincy then married Robert Hull, the father of John Hull. John and Edmund were therefore step-brothers as well as in-laws. John and Judith Quincy Hull raised Daniel Quincy from the age of seven.

His first wife was Joanna Hoar, sister of Leonard Hoar (President of Harvard College); and they had 10 children:

- Daniel Quincy (7 Dec 1650-1690) married Anna Shepard. Ancestors of Presidents John Adams and John Quincy Adams;
- John Quincy (5 Feb 1652-died young);
- Mary Quincy (4 Jan 1654-1676) married c 1670 to Ephraim Savage. Other sources give the year 1649 for her birth year.;
- Johanna/Joanna Quincy (16 Feb 1654-18 May 1695) married David Hobart;
- Judeth Quincy (25 April 1655 – 8 May 1679) married Rev. John Raynor, Jr.;
- Elizabeth Quincy (28 July 1656-?) married 1681 Rev. John Daniel Gookin.;
- Edmond Quincy (9 May 1657-died age 4 months);
- Ruth Quincy (29 Oct 1658-?) married 19 Oct 1686 John Hunt.;
- Ann Quincy (3 September 1663 – 1676);
- Experience Quincy married William Saul.;

. Edmund and his second wife, Elizabeth, the widow of Rev. John Elliot of Newton and daughter of Major General Daniel Gookin, had 2 children.

- Edmund Quincy III was very active in colonial affairs, like his father. His son was Josiah Quincy I.
- Mary Quincy (c. 1684 – 29 March 1716) married Rev. Daniel Baker, of Shirborne. His grave was once marked with two granite columns embossed with lead. The lead was stripped for use by the colonists during the Revolution. This was noted by President John Adams.

=== Descendants ===
Many of Edmund's descendants were active in the American Revolution, some of the more notable being John Quincy Adams and Dorothy Quincy. The family intermarried with other local South Shore families, especially with the Hobarts of nearby Hingham.

== See also ==
- Quincy political family
