= Josiah Quincy House =

Historic house in Massachusetts, United States

- U.S. National Register of Historic Places
- U.S. National Historic Landmark
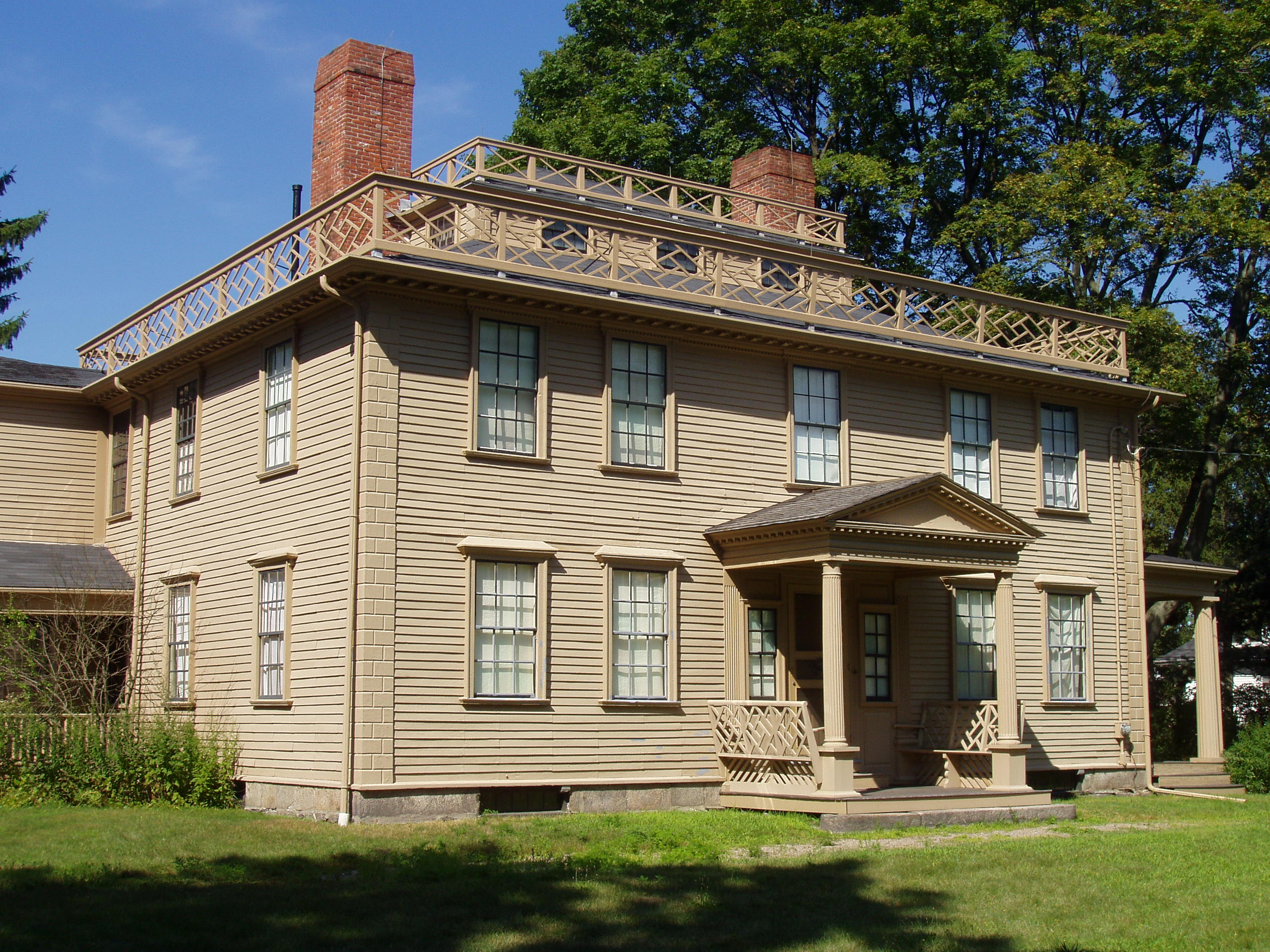
- The Josiah Quincy House, Quincy, Massachusetts

- Location within Massachusetts Location within the United States
- Location: Quincy, Massachusetts
- Coordinates: 42°16′18″N 71°0′53″W
- Built: 1770
- Architect: Pierce, Deacon Edward
- Architectural style: Georgian
- NRHP reference No.: 76000285

Significant dates
- Added to NRHP: May 28, 1976
- Designated NHL: September 25, 1997

The Josiah Quincy House /ˈkwɪnzi/, located at 20 Muirhead Street in the Wollaston neighborhood of Quincy, Massachusetts, was the country home of Revolutionary War soldier Colonel Josiah Quincy I, the first in a line of six men named Josiah Quincy that included three Boston mayors and a president of Harvard University.

== History ==
Having inherited the land from father Edmund, Josiah built his mansion on a 200-acre (81 ha) farm called the "Lower Farm," which had been in the family since 1635. The house was built in 1770 and was originally surrounded by fields and pasture overlooking Quincy Bay. It is constructed with an unusual hipped monitor roof, the oldest known example of this roof style to survive from the original colonies, and includes a Chinese fretwork balustrade and classical portico. Its attic contains four small rooms for servants, one with a fireplace.

During the American Revolution, Quincy aided General George Washington by observing the British fleet in Boston Harbor from his attic windows. He scratched on a pane of glass in the attic, "October 10, 1775 Governor Gage saild for England with a fair wind." That glass pane has been preserved and now on view in the front hall.

In 1895, the house and some adjoining properties were sold to Frank E. Hall of Boston. In 1937, Edward R. Hall arranged for the Josiah Quincy House to become the property of the Society for the Preservation of New England Antiquities. The house is now owned by Historic New England, a non-profit historical organization, and is open for tours from June to October. It was designated a National Historic Landmark in 1997 for its architectural significance and for its association with the Quincy family.

== See also ==
- Josiah Quincy Mansion
- Dorothy Quincy House
- Quincy family
- List of National Historic Landmarks in Massachusetts
- National Register of Historic Places listings in Quincy, Massachusetts
