= Edmund Quincy (1808–1877) =

American writer and abolitionist (1808–1877)

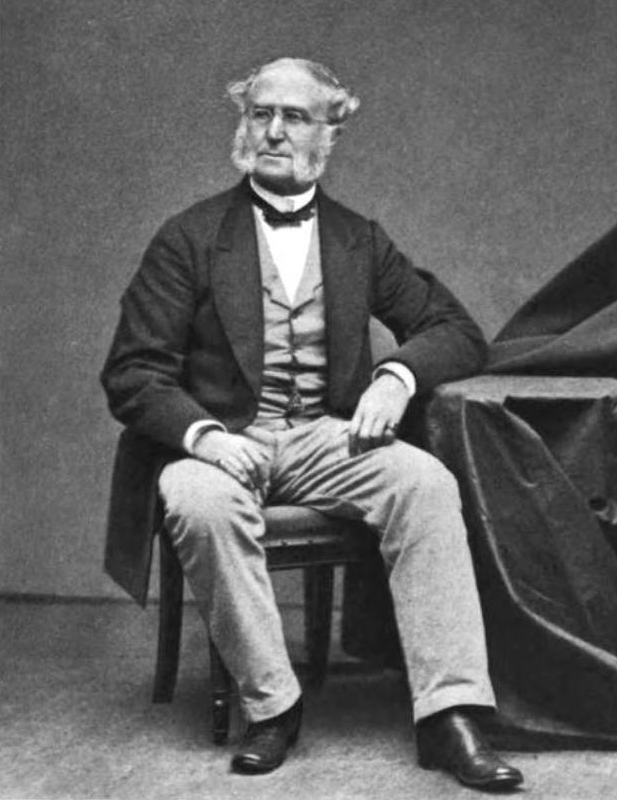
- Born: February 1, 1808; Boston, Massachusetts
- Died: May 17, 1877 (aged 69); Dedham, Massachusetts
- Education: Harvard University; Phillips Academy
- Occupations: Writer; abolitionist
- Spouse: Lucilla P. Parker (m. 1833)

Signature
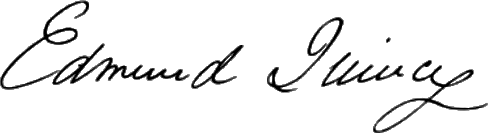

Edmond Quincy V (1808–1877) was an American writer and abolitionist.

== Early life ==
Edmund Quincy was born in Boston on February 1, 1808, the second son of Josiah Quincy III and Eliza Susan Morton Quincy. His siblings included, Josiah, Eliza, Abigail, Maria, Margaret, and Anna.

He was an abolitionist editor and also the author of a biography of his father, a romance, Wensley (1854), and The Haunted Adjutant and Other Stories (1885).

Quincy graduated from Phillips Academy, Andover, in 1823, and Harvard in 1827. In 1833, Quincy married Lucilla P. Parker after graduating from Harvard University.

== Career ==
In 1837, Quincy joined the Massachusetts Anti-Slavery Society and was corresponding secretary (1844–1853). He became a member of the American Anti-Slavery Society in 1838 and served as vice-president in 1853 and 1856–1859.

In 1839, he became an editor of The Abolitionist, one of the organs of the Massachusetts Anti-Slavery Society. From 1839 to 1856, he was a contributor to the Liberty Bell, edited by Maria Weston Chapman for the annual anti-slavery fairs.

In 1844, he became an editor of the National Anti-Slavery Standard, the organ of the American Anti-Slavery Society. He also edited The Liberator when William Lloyd Garrison was absent (e.g. in 1843, 1846 and 1847).

Quincy was also active in the Non-Resistance Society which condemned the use of force in resisting evil, renounced allegiance to human government, and because of the anti-slavery cause, favored non-union with the American South. He, along Chapman and Garrison, published the Non-Resistant (1839–1840), which lasted only two years.

In 1870, he was elected as a member of the American Philosophical Society.

He was elected a member of the American Antiquarian Society in 1875.

== Death ==
He died in Dedham, Massachusetts on May 17, 1877.
