= John Hull (merchant) =

English-born merchant and politician (1624–1683)

- Hull's coat of arms

Treasurer of the Massachusetts General Court
- In office 1676–1680

Member of the Massachusetts House of Deputies
- In office 1668
- Constituency: Wenham
- In office 1671–1674
- Constituency: Westfield
- In office 1679
- Constituency: Salisbury

Personal details
- Born: December 18, 1624 Market Harborough, Leicestershire, England
- Died: October 1, 1683 (aged 58) Boston, Massachusetts Bay Colony, English America
- Resting place: Granary Burial Ground
- Spouse: Judith Quincy
- Children: 5, including Hannah Sewall
- Relatives: Quincy family (by marriage); Samuel Sewall (son-in-law)
- Education: Boston Latin School (graduated in 1637)
- Occupation: Merchant; silversmith; slave trader; politician

John Hull (December 18, 1624 – October 1, 1683) was an English-born merchant, silversmith, slave trader, and politician, who spent the majority of his life in the Massachusetts Bay Colony. After arriving in North America, he worked as a silversmith in Boston before becoming the moneyer responsible for issuing the colony's pine tree shillings in the mid-17th century. Hull was also a successful merchant and engaged in slave-trading on multiple occasions. He was also an early benefactor of Harvard College and a co-founder of the Old South Church.

== Early life and family ==
John Hull was born on December 18, 1624, in Market Harborough, Leicestershire, England, the son of blacksmith Robert Hull and Elizabeth Storer. At age eleven, he immigrated to the Massachusetts Bay Colony with his father, mother, and half-brother Richard Storer, departing Bristol on September 28, 1635, and arriving in Boston on November 7. The colony gave Robert Hull a 25-acre farming plot, though he primarily made his living as a smith.

In England, Hull received an education at a grammar school. After immigrating, he attended Boston Latin School for two years, followed by a seven-year smithing apprenticeship, which could have lasted from 1639 to 1646, though Hermann F. Clarke speculates that Hull would have finished his apprenticeship around 1643 or 1644. In December 1646, his father deeded to him a house and garden, where he began practicing the silversmith trade.

On May 11, 1647, he married Judith Quincy, daughter of Judith Pares and Edmund Quincy, in a ceremony officiated by John Winthrop. In 1648, they joined John Cotton's First Church in Boston. John and Judith had five children, four of whom died in infancy. They had twin girls on January 23, 1652, both of whom died at age one. On November 3, 1654, they had a son who died after 11 days, and in 1658 they had a second son, Samuel, who lived nineteen days. Their only child to survive to adulthood, Hannah, was born on February 14, 1657, and married Samuel Sewall on February 28, 1676.

== Silversmith ==
Hull employed Robert Sanderson as his assistant in his silversmithing business, and also had apprentices, including Sanderson's three sons, Samuel Paddy, Jeremiah Dummer, Timothy Dwight, and Daniel Quincy. Sanderson's mark is present alongside Hull's on almost all pieces produced by the shop. A set of silver beakers are among the only of Hull's surviving works completed without assistance from Sanderson or an apprentice.

=== Massachusetts Bay Colony coinage ===
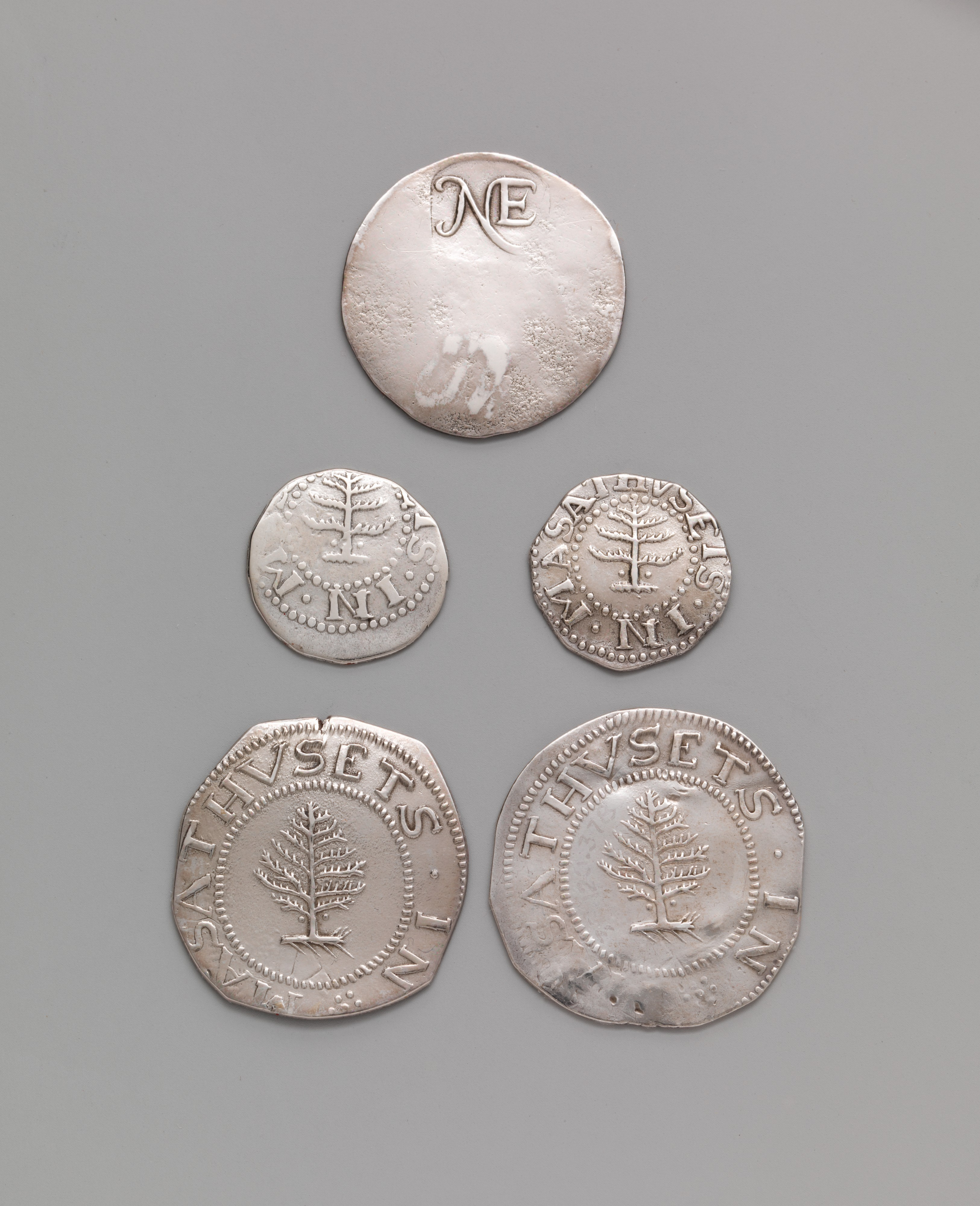
Massachusetts Bay Colony coinage

From the 1620s through the early 1650s, the Massachusetts Bay Colony's economy had been entirely dependent on barter and foreign currency, including English, Spanish, Dutch, Portuguese and counterfeit coins. In 1652, the Massachusetts General Court asked Hull to weigh, assay, and countermark foreign coins to determine their authenticity and value. Hull rejected the idea, which would not have generated profit for him, and on May 26, 1652, the General Court authorized Hull to create Massachusetts coinage in shilling, sixpence and threepence denominations by reminting foreign silver currency. Hull was made Boston "mintmaster" and the colonial government paid for tools and construction of a minting facility on Hull's land, so that he could convert silver bullion and foreign coinage into Massachusetts Bay Colony coins. Sanderson may have been primarily responsible for producing the coins.

From June to October 1652, Hull produced silver coins with a simple design: the stamped letters "NE" for New England on the obverse, and the denomination in Roman numerals on the reverse. In October 1652, the General Court ordered a more complicated design with a double ring of beads to discourage clipping. Although all the coins use the date 1652, they can be broken into three chronological periods based on the design of the tree on the obverse: the willow tree, 1652–60; the oak tree, 1660–67; and the pine tree, 1667–82. The last design led to the series being known as pine tree shillings. In 1662, Hull and Sanderson also produced a series of oak tree twopence coins with the date 1662. In total, the Boston mint may have produced as many as 300,000 to 500,000 coins.

Hull made a seigniorage of one shilling, seven pence for every 20 shillings produced, and in some years, Hull made of profit over £1000. The Massachusetts General Court tried to renegotiate the arrangement to decrease Hull's profits on at least seven occasions. Massachusetts also charged rent on the minting facility until Hull purchased the operation in 1675.

Hull had begun minting coins during English Commonwealth period, and in 1661 after the restoration of the monarchy, the English government considered the Boston mint to be treasonous. In 1665, Privy Council ordered the mint to cease operations, but the colony ignored the demands. In 1676, Edward Randolph petitioned the English government to close the mint. However, the mint may have continued operations until 1682, when Hull's contract as mintmaster expired, and the colony did not move to renew his contract or appoint a new mintmaster. The coinage was a contributing factor to the revocation of the Massachusetts Bay Colony charter in 1684.

== Merchant and landowner ==
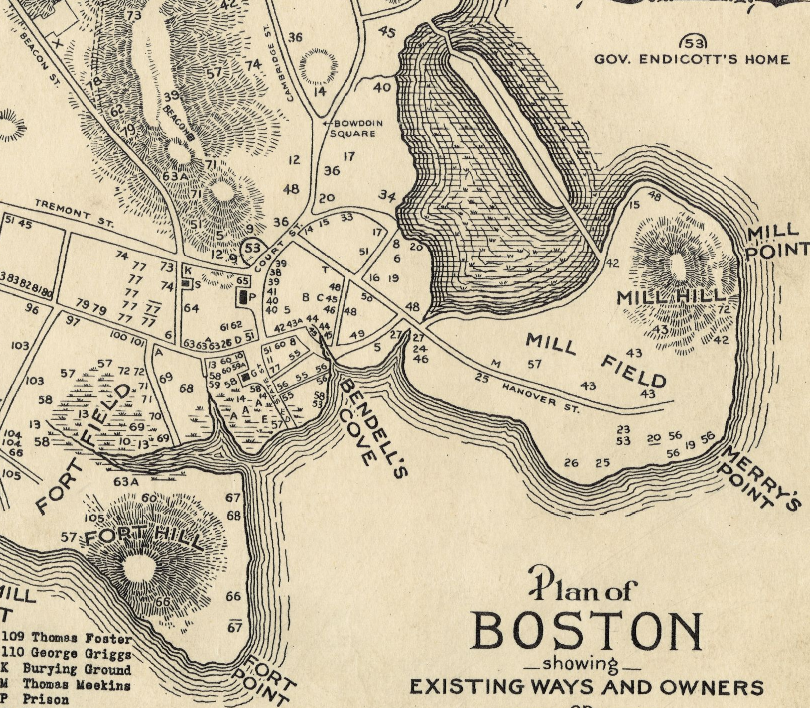
Map of Boston land ownership on December 25, 1635. #96 corresponds to the land John Hull received from his father in 1646.

Hull first mentioned exporting goods to England in a November 1653 diary entry. Between 1653 and 1660, he exported goods to Europe on at least five different ships, and his mercantile interests increased after 1660. The first record of Hull holding a partial ownership stake in a ship is from 1664. Between 1665 and 1670, Hull had partial ownership of eight vessels, and from 1670 to 1683, he partially owned 14 vessels and exported goods on more than 50 different ships. He had business agents in England, Jamaica, New Providence, Nevis, Madeira and the Canary Islands.

He primarily exported furs, fish and wood from New England forests. He also shipped New England farm products, including flour, salt beef and pork, biscuits and butter to the Caribbean colonies, as well as other miscellaneous goods. He imported hides for leather, salt, clothing, and alcohol to Massachusetts. He also dealt in mortgages and was a money lender.

Hull ordered his ship captains not to sell damaged goods, mistreat sailors, swear, or trade on Sundays. Mark Valeri claims that Hull forbid his associates from the slave trade, but Clarke has identified two occasions when Hull engaged in the slave trade: the first during King Philip's War in 1675, when Hull transported more than one-hundred Native American captives to be sold into slavery in Cádiz and Málaga, and the second on September 16, 1682, when he instructed one of his captains to transport and sell a Black man named Jeofrey and a Black woman named Mary in Madeira. Samuel Eliot Morison notes that Hull instructed his captain to use the proceeds from the sale of Jeofrey and Mary to buy Madeira wine to be imported to Massachusetts.

In 1657, Hull and four other men negotiated the Pettaquamscutt Purchase with the Narragansett people in Rhode Island, buying a tract of land on the western shore of Narragansett Bay for £151. Hull acquired land on Block Island and Point Judith, which is named for Hull's wife. He initially tried to operate a lead mine at Point Judith. When the mine proved unprofitable, Hull began raising herds of cattle, sheep, pigs, and horses on the land to be sold in the West Indies. He was also the co-owner of a tract of forest and a sawmill at Salmon Falls in New Hampshire.

Valeri characterizes Hull as having belonged to the upper ranks of Boston's merchants, though some traders built larger fortunes and others held larger tracts of land.

== Civic life ==
From 1648, Hull was a member of the Ancient and Honorable Artillery Company of Massachusetts. He appears in records as an ensign in 1663, a lieutenant in 1664, and a captain in 1671 and 1678. He first held political office as a selectman for Boston, beginning in March 1657. He became Boston's treasurer in 1658, and held near-uninterrupted office for the next decade. He sat in the Massachusetts General Court as representative for Wenham in 1668, Westfield from 1671 to 1674, and Salisbury in 1679. He was treasurer of the Massachusetts Bay Colony from 1676 to 1680.

In 1669, Hull left the First Church and became a founding member of the Third Church in Boston. That year, he was part of a group that traveled to England to hire the church's minister.

During King Philip's War in 1675 and 1676, Hull loaned the colony approximately £2000 to buy muskets, shot, and saltpeter, and to clothe and pay the soldiers. He was also one of the primary merchants responsible for procuring weapons, ammunitions and supplies from Europe. Among his responsibilities as treasurer during the war, Hull arranged the sale of Native American captives into slavery. Hull recorded the sale of 185 people into slavery in public auctions on August 24, 1676, and September 23, 1676. Some buyers, such as Thomas Smith, purchased as many as 70 captives to resell in European slave markets. Hull used his personal resources to extend credit to the colony and may have suffered financial losses from his loans to Massachusetts, which were not settled in his lifetime, but Mark Peterson speculates that the colony may have used some of the £333, 3s proceeds from the slave trade to partially repay its debt to Hull. Hull's widow and son-in-law, Samuel Sewall, settled the remaining debt with the colony in 1683 after Hull's death.

In 1681, Hull helped organize a settlement with the heirs of Ferdinando Gorges to acquire the Province of Maine for the Massachusetts Bay Colony. He raised £700 from Boston merchants and acquired an additional £550 from London against his personal credit.

Hull was one of Harvard College's earliest benefactors, donating his landholdings at Point Judith, Rhode Island, to finance scholarships for poor boys as well as a sum of £100.

== Death and legacy ==
Hull died on October 1, 1683. Samuel Willard preached his funeral sermon, and he was buried in the Granary Burying Ground. At the time of his death, his estate was worth approximately £6000.

Hull Street in Boston is named for him, because the road was laid through his pasture. In the 1840 story collection Grandfather's Chair, Nathaniel Hawthorne recounts a legend in which John Hull gave his daughter Hannah her weight in pine-tree shillings (approximately 10,000 coins) as a dowery at her wedding to Samuel Sewall. Hawthorne and other authors exaggerated the dowery, which was actually £500 paid in two installments.
