= Edmund Quincy (1681–1737) =

American merchant and judge (1681–1737)

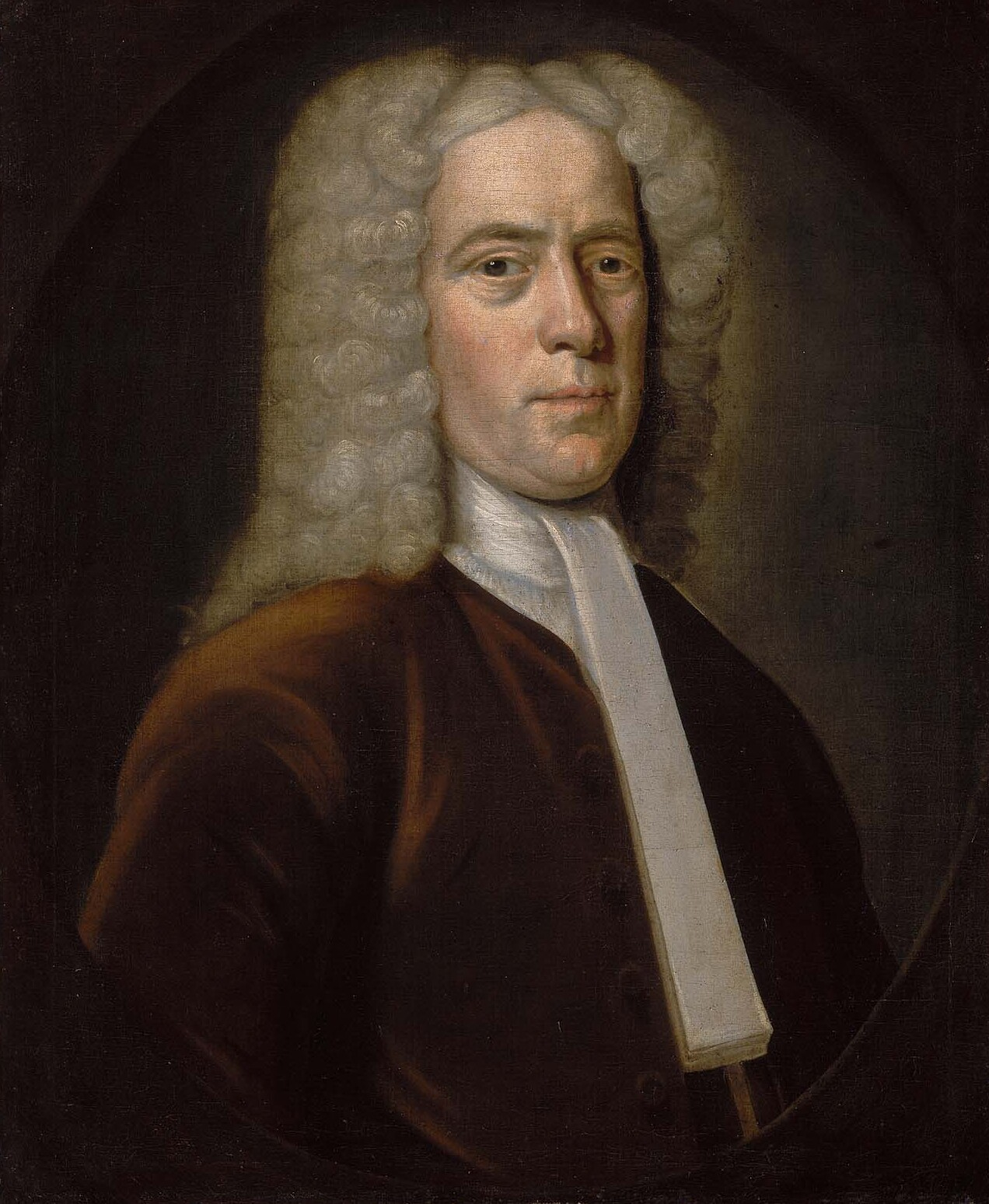
- Portrait by John Smibert, 1737
- Born: 14 October 1681; Braintree, Massachusetts
- Died: 23 February 1737 (aged 55); London, England
- Resting place: Burnhill Fields Burial Grounds, London, England
- Education: Harvard University 1699
- Occupations: Merchant and Judge
- Title: Judge, Colonel, Commissioner
- Spouse: Dorothy Flynt (1678–1737)
- Children: 6
- Parent(s): Edmund Quincy (1628–1698) and Elizabeth Gookin (1645-1700)
- Relatives: Quincy political family

Edmund Quincy (/ˈkwɪnzi/; 1681–1737) was an American merchant and judge. He was the son of Colonel Edmund Quincy and his second wife Elizabeth. He married Dorothy Flynt and had 7 children. Four lived to adulthood, including Edmund Quincy IV and Dorothy Quincy, who was the topic of a famous poem by Oliver Wendell Holmes Sr.

== Life ==
Coat of Arms of Edmund Quincy III

Like his father and grandfather, he was deeply involved with the affairs of the Massachusetts colony. He was a magistrate, Supreme Court judge from 1718 until his death, and a colonel in the Massachusetts militia. In 1737, he was appointed to a commission to settle the boundary between Massachusetts and New Hampshire. However, he contracted smallpox and died before his return to Massachusetts. The colony built a monument at his grave in Brunhill Fields Burial Ground in London and gave 1,000 acres (4.0 km^{2}) in Lenox to his family as a tribute for all of his efforts.

== See also ==
Quincy political family
