= Josiah Quincy I =

American merchant, planter, soldier, and politician (1710–1784)

Colonel Josiah Quincy I
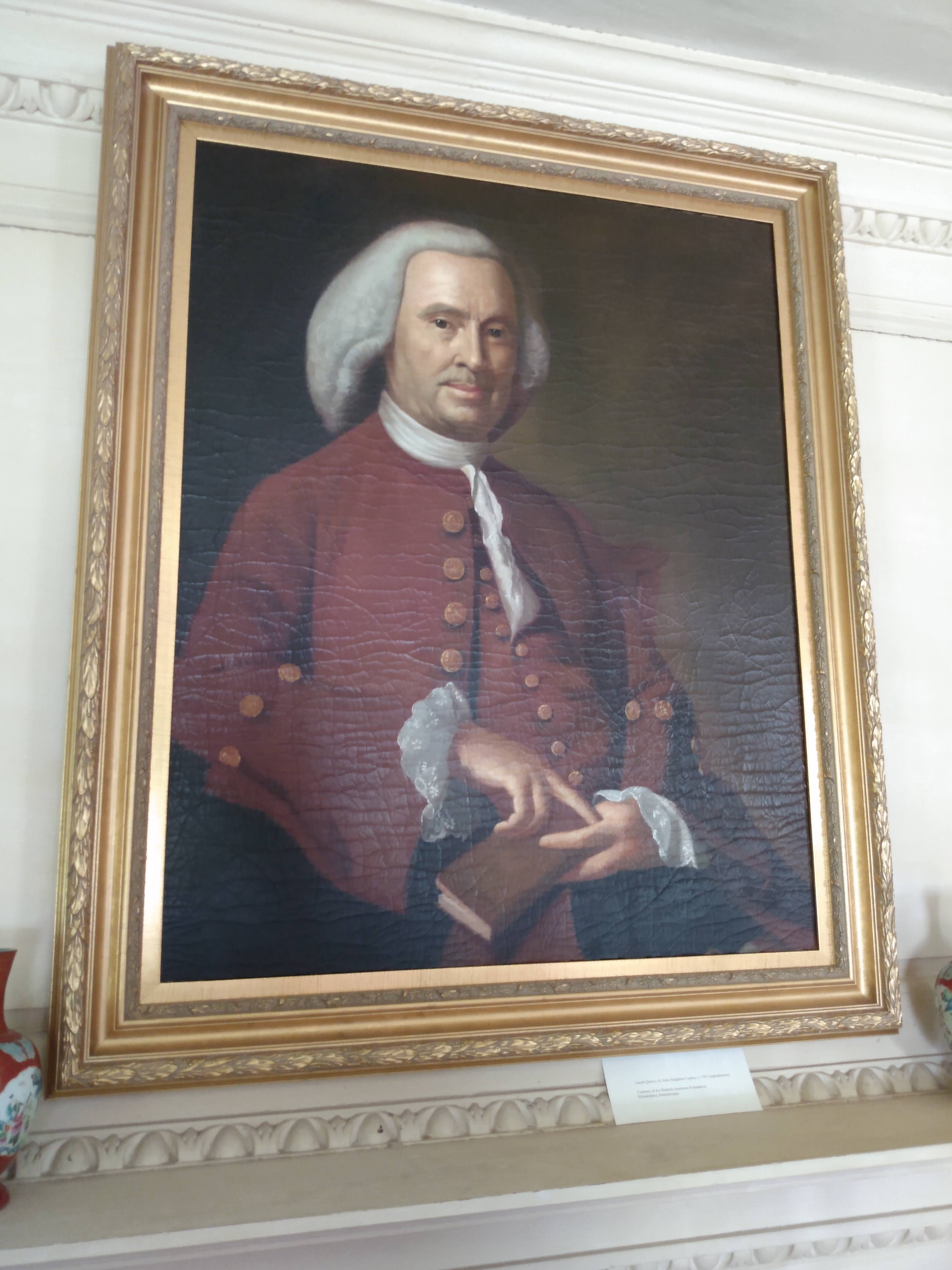
- Born: 1 April 1710; Braintree, Province of Massachusetts Bay, British North America
- Died: 3 March 1784 (aged 73); Braintree, Massachusetts, U.S.
- Education: Harvard University
- Occupations: Merchant; planter; soldier; politician
- Title: Colonel
- Spouses: Hanna Sturgis (m. 1733; died 1755); Elizabeth Waldron (died); Ann Marsh
- Children: 7, including Josiah Quincy II
- Father: Edmund Quincy III
- Family: Quincy political family

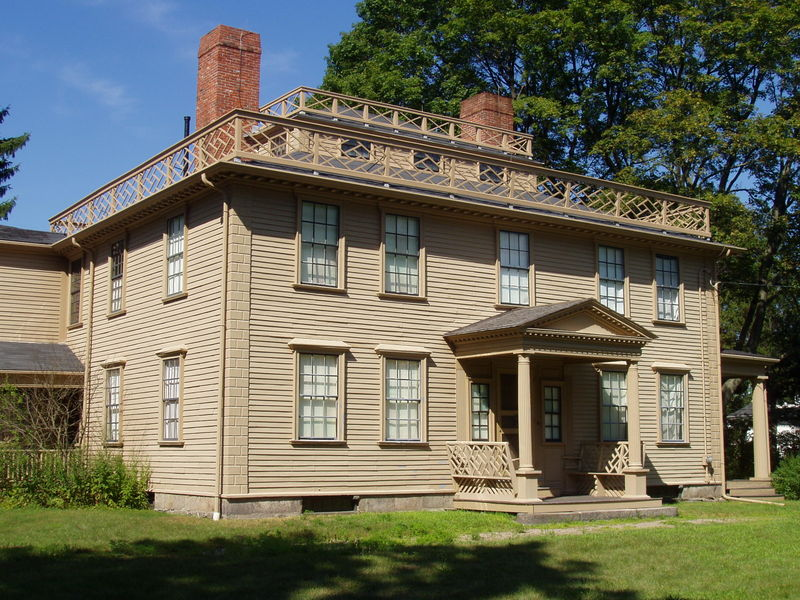
Quincy House, Quincy, Massachusetts

Colonel Josiah Quincy I (1 April 1710 – 3 March 1784) was an American merchant, planter, soldier, and politician. He was the son of Colonel Edmund Quincy III and Dorothy Flynt Quincy.

== Early life and education ==
Josiah Quincy was born on 1 April 1710 in Braintree, Massachusetts. He was named after his grandfather, Reverend Josiah Flynt.

After graduating from Harvard in 1728, he returned to Braintree, Massachusetts. In 1735, he moved to Boston and engaged in commerce and shipbuilding. He returned to Braintree in 1748. Josiah was an American Patriot and supporter. He wrote to General George Washington about British troop movements and was a friend of Benjamin Franklin.

== Career ==
He was in business with his brother Edmund. He and his father traveled in Europe, making contacts and contracts to promote the business. When his firm's ship, Bethel, captured the Spanish ship Jesus Maria and Joseph in 1748, he retired from that business and went back to Braintree. He was a local magistrate and a colonel of the Suffolk Regiment who made investments. He went to Pennsylvania as a commissioner in 1755 to ask for assistance in a proposed expedition to Crown Point in the French and Indian War. Benjamin Franklin helped him and remained a friend. In retirement, Franklin assisted Quincy and Joseph Palmer in several speculative business ventures involving glass, candle, and chocolate making.

== Personal life ==
He married Hanna Sturgis in 1733. They had: Edmund, Samuel, Hannah, and Josiah. Hanna died in 1755. Josiah married Elizabeth Waldron, and they had a daughter named Elizabeth. He married Ann Marsh after his second wife died, and they had Nancy and Frances. Josiah Quincy died in 1784.

Josiah's sons, Samuel and Josiah, took part in the trial of Captain Thomas Preston for the murders committed at the Boston Massacre. Samuel, who was a Tory, was in charge of the prosecution as the solicitor-general. His younger brother Josiah Quincy II, an outspoken critic of the British and proponent for an American Revolution, and John Adams were the defending counsel.

== See also ==
- Quincy political family
