= Edmund Quincy (1602–1636) =

English settler, soldier and politician

Edmund Quincy II
- Coat of Arms of Edmund Quincy II
- Born: 1602; Wigsthorpe, Northamptonshire, England
- Died: 1636
- Other name: Edmund Quincy II
- Occupations: Settler, Soldier, Planter, Politician, Merchant
- Title: Colonel
- Spouse: Judith Pares
- Children: 2 (including Edmund Quincy III)
- Parent(s): Edmund Quincy I (died 1627); Anne Palmer

Edmund Quincy II (1602–1636), known as "the Puritan", was an English settler, soldier, colonist, planter, landowner, merchant, and politician of Massachusetts Bay Colony in what later became the United States. He is notable as the progenitor of the Quincy family.

== England ==
Born 1602 in Wigsthorpe, Northamptonshire, England, Edmund's family may have been connected with the Earls of Winchester in the 13th century. The surname is Anglo-Norman. One descendant named Eliza Susan Quincy wrote in 1844 that Edmund once had "a genealogical account of his family, which traced their descent from the time of the Norman Conquest," which Abigail Adams apparently owned at one time, as well, but after a century in America it "was then unfortunately borrowed and never returned and has now been lost for more than 50 years." His parents were almost certainly Edmund Quincy (baptised 1559, died 1627) and Anne Palmer (married 1593). He is known to have lived in Thorpe in Achurch, Northamptonshire on an estate inherited from his father. He married Judith Pares in 1623 and had two children: Judith, born in 1626, and Edmund, born in 1628. He appears to have converted to Puritanism by the time of the birth of his son. His daughter Judith Quincy (1626–1695), married John Hull (1620–1683), leading merchant and mintmaster of Massachusetts Bay Colony.

== Emigration ==
Quincy came to Massachusetts for the first time in 1628, and emigrated to America along with the Reverend John Cotton on a ship called Griffin with his family and six servants, arriving in Boston Harbor 4 September 1633. The Quincys' names appear in the records of the First Church from the following year. On September 10, 1634, Quincy was the first person named to a committee, appointed by the Puritan colonists, to assess and raise the funds necessary to purchase the Shawmut Peninsula from William Blaxton. The following May, he was elected to represent the town of Boston at the first Massachusetts General Court held in Massachusetts Bay Colony.

== Mount Wollaston ==
In 1635, a thousand acres of land in what is now Quincy, Massachusetts, was sold by the Massachusett Indians to Quincy and William Coddington; the town of Boston confirmed the sale in 1636. The property consisted of a broad strip of land along the sea, extending somewhat beyond the boundaries of the settlement established by Captain Wollaston and Thomas Morton in 1625. Around the time of the purchase, Quincy built a one-story home on this land which would eventually develop into the Dorothy Quincy House. He died shortly thereafter, in 1636 or 1637.
