= Furnace Brook Parkway =

Historic parkway in Quincy, Massachusetts

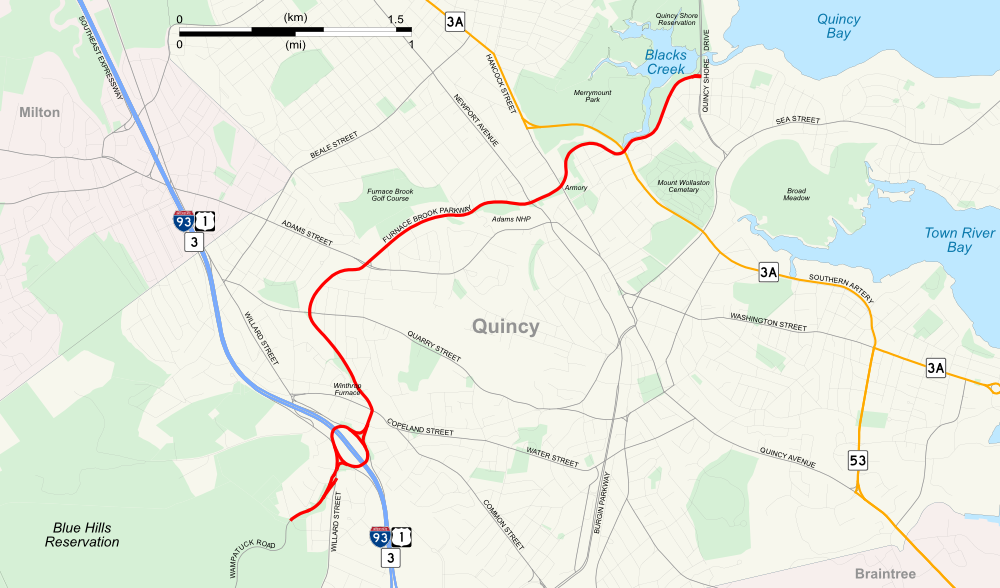
- Map with Furnace Brook Parkway highlighted in red.
- Interactive map of Furnace Brook Parkway
- Maintained by: Department of Conservation and Recreation
- Length: 3.4 mi (5.5 km)
- Location: Quincy, Norfolk County, Massachusetts
- West end: I-93 / US 1 / Route 3 in Quincy
- Major junctions: Route 3A in Quincy
- East end: Quincy Shore Drive in Quincy

Construction
- Completion: 1904-1916
- Furnace Brook Parkway
- U.S. National Register of Historic Places
- U.S. Historic district
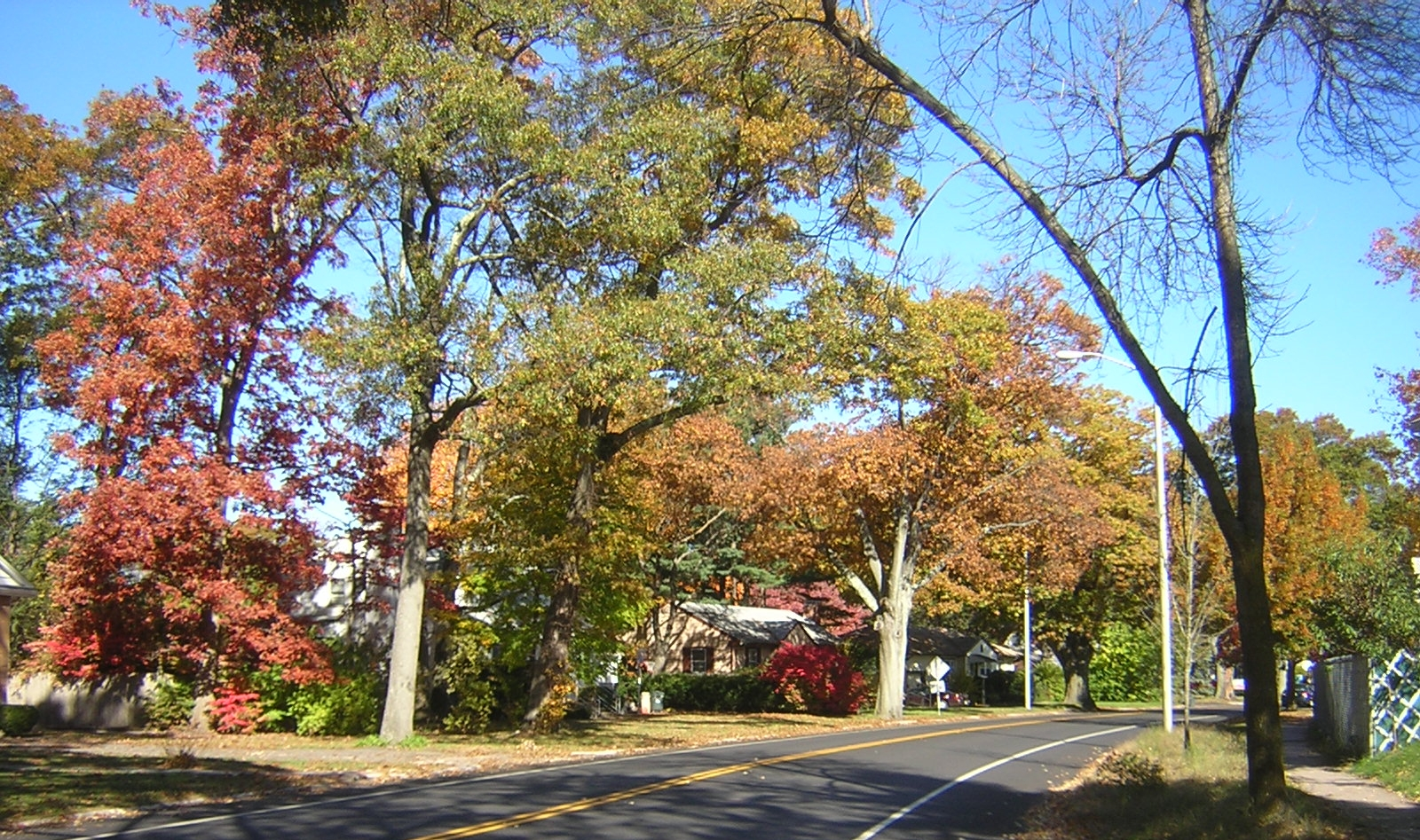

- Location within Massachusetts Location within the United States
- Location: Quincy, Massachusetts
- Coordinates: 42°14′58″N 71°1′46″W
- Built: 1904
- Architect: Charles Eliot; Olmsted Brothers
- MPS: Metropolitan Park System of Greater Boston MPS
- NRHP reference No.: 04000248
- Added to NRHP: March 18, 2004

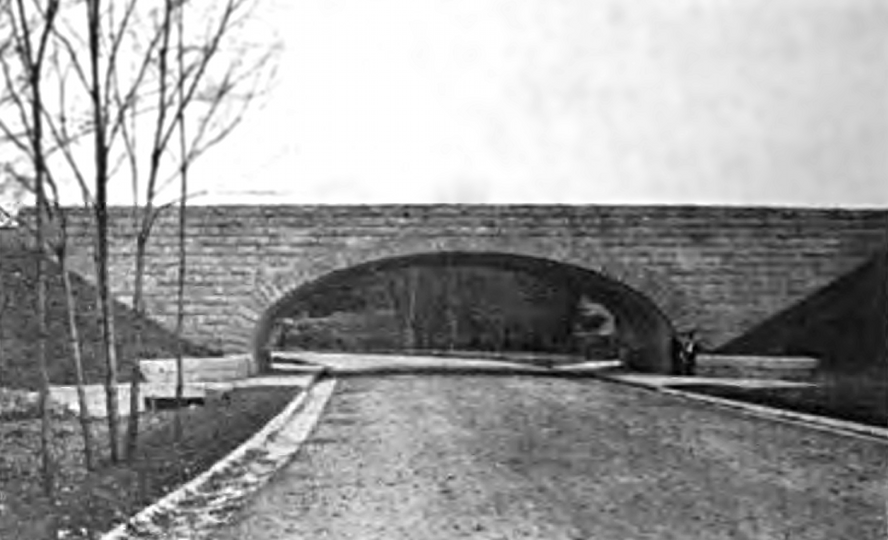
Granite Branch Bridge over the newly constructed parkway in 1909. The bridge was demolished during construction of the Southeast Expressway.

Furnace Brook Parkway is a historic parkway in Quincy, Massachusetts. Part of the Metropolitan Park System of Greater Boston, it serves as a connector between the Blue Hills Reservation and Quincy Shore Reservation at Quincy Bay. First conceived in the late nineteenth century, the state parkway is owned and maintained by the Massachusetts Department of Conservation and Recreation (DCR) and travels through land formerly owned by the families of John Adams and John Quincy Adams, passing several historic sites. It ends in the Merrymount neighborhood, where Quincy was first settled by Europeans in 1625 by Captain Richard Wollaston. The road was started in 1904, completed in 1916 and added to the National Register of Historic Places (NRHP) in 2004.

Furnace Brook Parkway approximately bisects central Quincy on a southwest–northeast line, following closely the courses of Furnace Brook and Blacks Creek, the estuary into which the brook flows, crossing them several times. For the majority of its length it is two lanes undivided, with the exception of directional lanes at a traffic circle (called a "rotary" in New England) where it meets Interstate 93.

== History ==
The parkway takes its name from the course of the stream it follows, Furnace Brook, which begins on the eastern slopes of the Blue Hills and meanders for about four miles from southwest to northeast through the middle of Quincy, ending where it meets the Atlantic estuary known as Blacks Creek near Quincy Bay. The brook was named in the seventeenth century for its proximity to the Winthrop Iron Furnace, also known as Braintree Furnace, the first iron blast furnace established in what would become the United States. The furnace and forge operation was started in 1644 by John Winthrop the Younger in the North Precinct of Braintree, which became the separate town of Quincy in 1792.

=== Design ===
The use of the land adjacent to Furnace Brook was first conceived by landscape architect Charles Eliot, who had apprenticed with Frederick Law Olmsted and later assumed leadership of Olmsted's design firm in 1893. Olmsted had been responsible for the development of Central Park in Manhattan and, with Eliot, had worked to create Boston's Emerald Necklace, a string of connected parks and waterways. Eliot was instrumental in the founding of The Trustees of Reservations and the public Metropolitan Parks Commission in the 1890s and envisioned an expansion of the parks network to areas surrounding Boston. Among these were the Middlesex Fells, Stony Brook, Blue Hills and Quincy Shore Reservations; Furnace Brook was viewed as an integral part of the system, with an urban parkway proposed connecting the Blue Hills and Quincy Shore portions.

=== Construction ===
Funding for the proposed parkway along Furnace Brook was passed by the Massachusetts General Court in 1901. The proposed route of the parkway was soon also scheduled for use in directing a portion of a major sewer line from Boston to Nut Island at the end of Hough's Neck in 1902. The western part of the parkway was both planned and completed first, with plans for the section from Wampatuck Road to Hancock Street submitted in 1903. Construction of the roadway began in 1904, with a major component, a granite-faced concrete bridge carrying the Granite Branch of the New York, New Haven and Hartford Railroad over the parkway route completed in 1906. Subgrading of the road surface from the Blue Hills Reservation to Adams Street was also completed at that time. Construction of the roadway from Blue Hills to Adams Street and most of the land acquisition required for the continuation of the route to Quincy Shore was completed by January 1908.

=== Completion ===
Further land acquisition and construction continued through the next several years. Also during this time new structures began to appear along the route, with a notable section of Colonial Revival-style triple deckers being added by 1910. Work on a stone and concrete bridge carrying the parkway over Blacks Creek began in the fall of 1915. Construction was finished later the next year and the completed Furnace Brook Parkway was officially opened for public travel on November 18, 1916.

=== Post-completion ===
Following completion of the parkway the speed limit was set at twenty miles per hour. This has been increased to the current limit of thirty miles per hour; a previously legislated restriction against the placement of advertising signs along the road has always been enforced. A gas station at 507 Furnace Brook Parkway was added in 1929, but has been replaced by a newly constructed dance studio (2011-ish).

The parkway route has been the same since completion in 1916, with the exception of one major interruption caused by the construction of the Interstate Highway System in the 1950s. The Southeast Expressway, which carries Interstate 93 along with U.S. Route 1 and Massachusetts Route 3, was constructed over the right-of-way of the former New York, New Haven and Hartford rail line in 1956–57. At the modern Exit 8, the old Granite Branch railroad bridge over the parkway was demolished, and a portion of the parkway was replaced with a large rotary and system of ramps to serve the limited access expressway. In 1997, the southbound exit ramp from the expressway was moved 1,500 feet (460 m) north to handle expected long queues of exiting dump trucks moving dirt excavated from the Big Dig construction project. The dirt removed was used to fill former granite quarries and create the land now occupied by the Granite Links at Quarry Hills golf complex located north of the parkway on Ricciuti Drive, which ends at the expressway southbound exit ramp for Furnace Brook Parkway.

== Route description ==
=== Blue Hills to Adams Street ===
Furnace Brook Parkway begins at the east end of Wampatuck Road, one of the Blue Hills Reservation Parkways, located at the gated northeastern entrance to the Blue Hills Reservation at Bunker Hill Road in West Quincy. The reservation gates at this intersection are open during the day and closed from 8 PM to 7 AM. From Bunker Hill Road the parkway travels east to northeast for 1,300 feet (400 m) before merging with Willard Street, formerly a northern segment of Massachusetts Route 37. The two roads enter the Furnace Brook Rotary as they meet amid single-lane directional roadways. Rotary traffic proceeds counterclockwise, with ramps entering and exiting the Southeast Expressway on either side of the limited access highway; Furnace Brook Parkway exits on the northeastern side of the rotary after passing under the expressway. Traffic traveling westbound on the parkway around the rotary is carried above the expressway on a bridge where it meets exiting southbound expressway traffic in a cross weave.

Beyond the rotary the parkway proceeds through a four block long commercial district, the only commercial presence on its length except for two gas stations. Although its general course is to the northeast, upon crossing Copeland Street here, it takes a wide swing to the northwest. Near Cross Street, it passes within 250 feet of the Winthrop Iron Furnace, which ultimately gave it its name. Between Cross and Quarry Streets, the Boston (northern) side becomes open land with the brook running down the middle of the open area, while the south side is residential. At Quarry street, its course is due north, and from here it goes generally northeast. From Quarry Street to Adams Street it is residential on both sides.

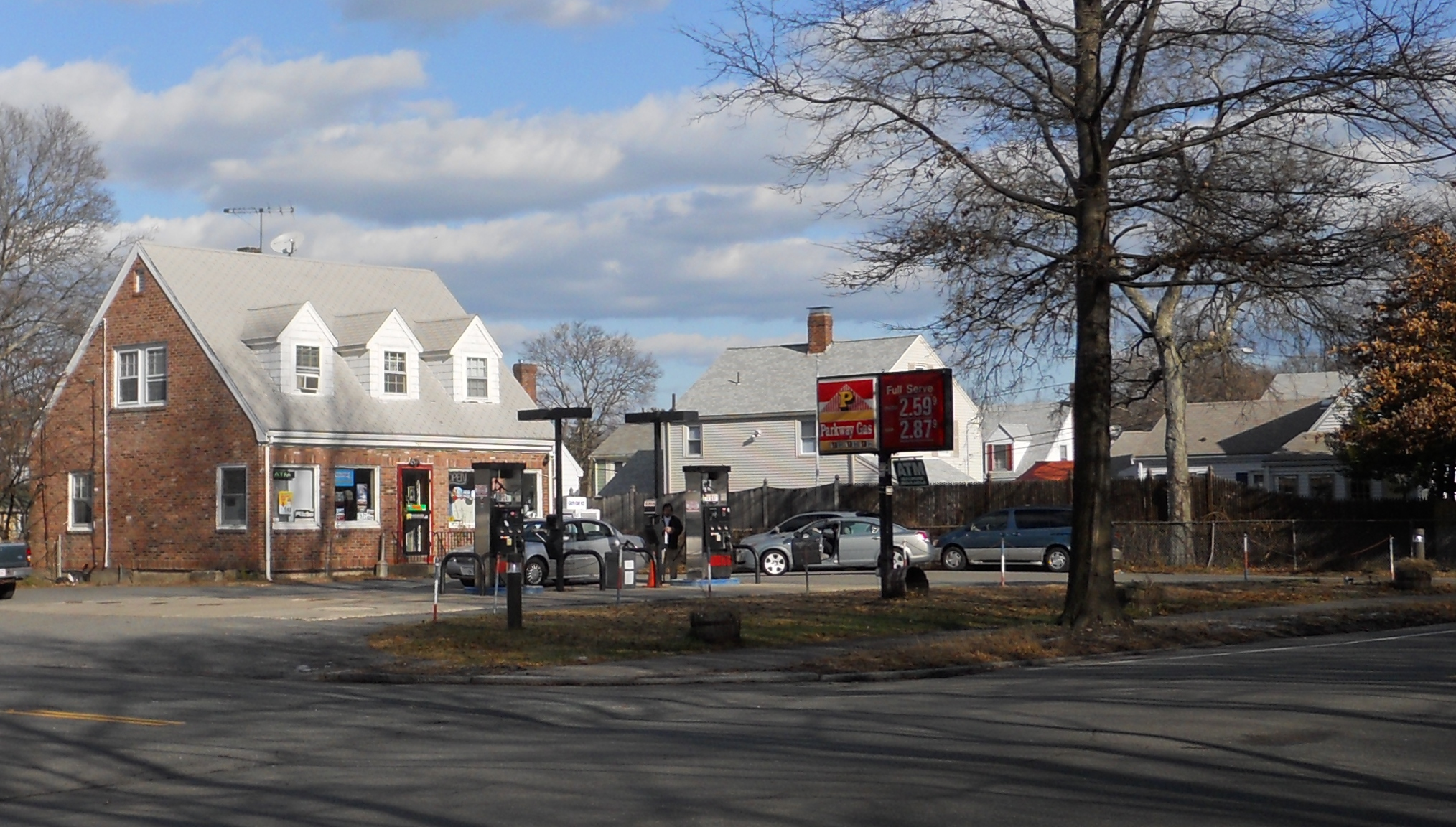
Parkway Gas, constructed in 1929

=== Between Adams and Hancock Streets ===
From Adams Street to Willow Avenue, the north side is the Furnace Brook Golf Course and the south is residential. Inset into the golf course is the Charles A. Bernazzani Elementary School. In this section, just west of Willow Avenue, the brook passes under the parkway to the south. From Willow Avenue to Newport Avenue, the north side is residential and the south side is occupied by the Rice Eventide Nursing Home, two residences, and the largest portion of Adams National Historical Park, including the Old House, the home of the Adams Family from 1788 until the early 20th century.

In the next block the parkway crosses under the MBTA Red Line and MBTA Commuter Rail tracks, which parallel Newport Avenue. In this area the road has residences on the north and Furnace Brook on the south.

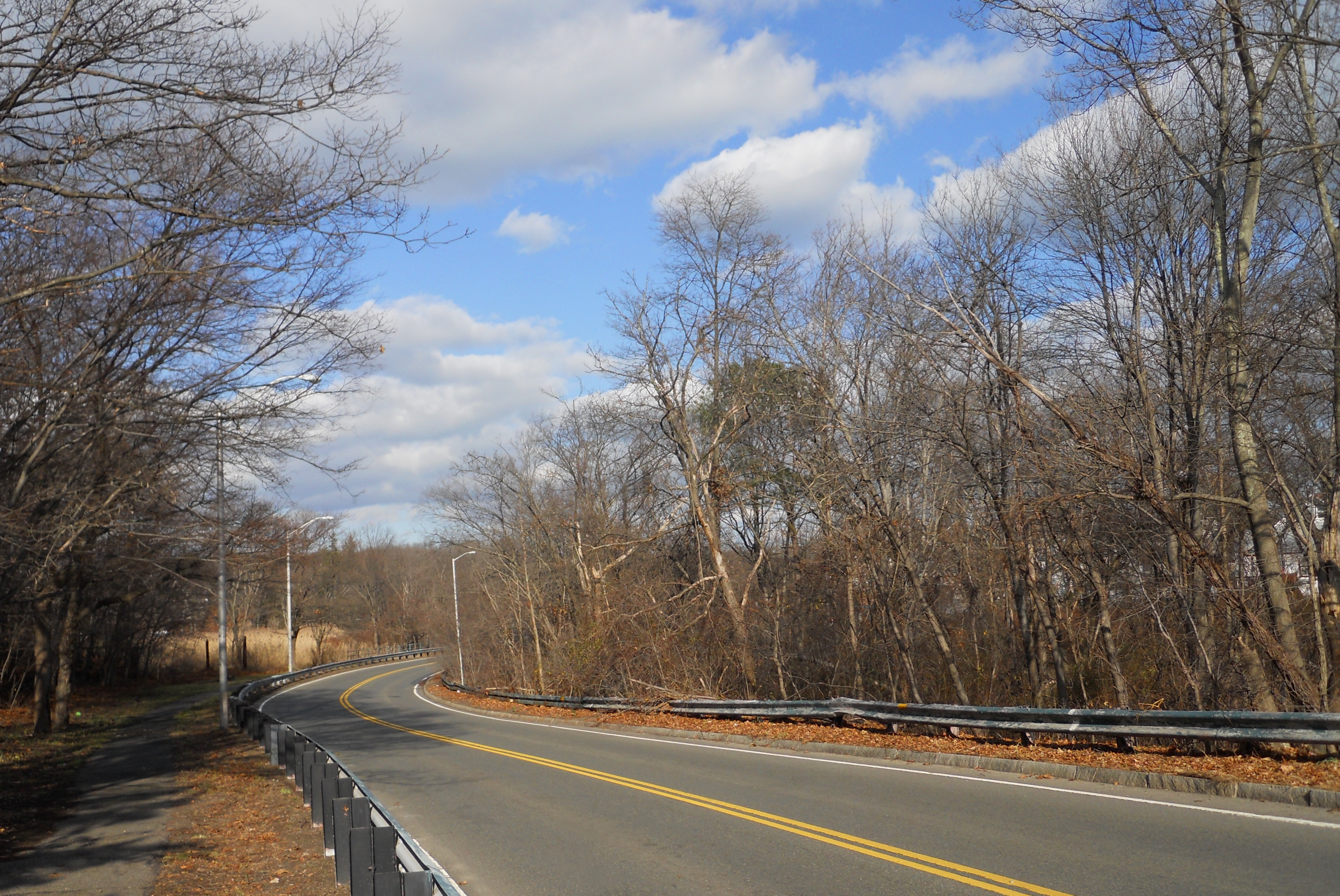
Northbound approaching Blacks Creek bridge

=== Hancock Street to Quincy Bay ===
On the southeast corner at Hancock Street is the Quincy National Guard Armory. South of the armory lies the Dorothy Quincy Homestead, a National Historic Landmark and the Dorothy Q Apartments, an NRHP site. In the section from Hancock Street to Southern Artery (Massachusetts Route 3A) the parkway crosses Blacks Creek at the point where the brook flows into the estuary. On the north side here is Merrymount Park and the Blacks Creek estuary, while the south is residential.

The last major section is from Southern Artery to Quincy Shore Drive. Here Furnace Brook Parkway traverses the northwest edge of Merrymount, the site of Quincy's founding in 1625. Beyond here, the view opens on the left to a panorama north across the creek and marshes to Quincy Bay and the Boston Harbor Islands beyond. Furnace Brook Parkway ends at the intersection with Quincy Shore Drive, with traffic crossing the drive continuing onto Shore Avenue.

== Major intersections ==
The entire route is in Quincy, Norfolk County.

| mi | km | Destinations | Notes |
|---|---|---|---|
| 0.0 | 0.0 | Wampatuck Road west | To Blue Hills Reservation |
| 0.5 | 0.80 | I-93 / US 1 / Route 3 / Willard Street – Boston, Braintree, Cape Cod, West Quincy | Traffic circle; exit 8 on I-93 / US 1 / MA 3 |
| 2.9 | 4.7 | Route 3A (Merrymount Parkway) | |
| 3.4 | 5.5 | Quincy Shore Drive | |
1.000 mi = 1.609 km; 1.000 km = 0.621 mi

== See also ==
- National Register of Historic Places listings in Quincy, Massachusetts
