= Wampatuck =

Wampatuck may refer to:

People

- Wampatuck or Wompatuck (d. 1669), a leader of the Mattakeesett tribe known to English settlers as Josiah Sagamore.

Places

- Wampatuck Pond, a pond in Hanson, Massachusetts

Ships

- USS Wampatuck (YT-337), later YTB-337, a United States Navy harbor tug in commission from 1942 to 1946
- USS Wompatuck (YT-27), a United States Navy armed tug in commission from 1898 to 1931
