= Quincy Shore Reservation =

Protected area in Massachusetts, US

Quincy Shores Reservation
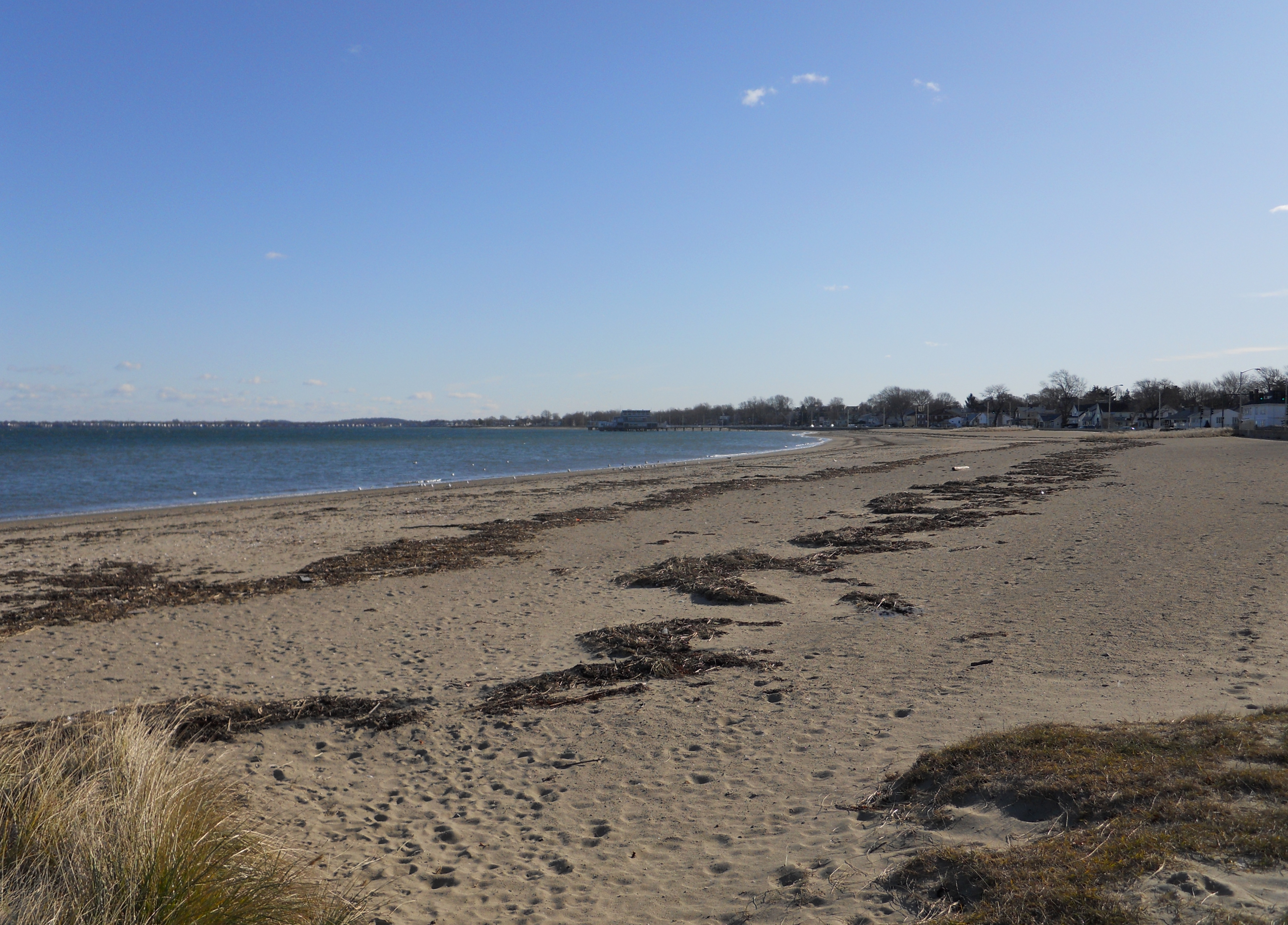

- Location within Massachusetts Location within the United States
- Location: Quincy, Massachusetts, United States
- Coordinates: 42°16′50″N 71°00′43″W
- Area: 87 acres (35 ha)
- Established: 1899
- Administrator: Massachusetts Department of Conservation and Recreation
- Website: Official website

Quincy Shores Reservation is a public recreation area and protected shoreline on Quincy Bay, Boston Harbor, in Quincy, Massachusetts. Its primary attraction is a 2.3-mile-long (3.7 km) beach, accessible along its entire length by Quincy Shore Drive. The largest beach on Boston Harbor, it is known locally as Wollaston Beach, named for the adjacent Wollaston neighborhood.

The reservation is part of the Metropolitan Park System of Greater Boston and was established in 1889. Also included in the reservation are Moswetuset Hummock, site of the first encounter of Plymouth Colony commander Myles Standish with the local native sachem, or leader, Chickatawbut in 1621 and cited as a source for the name of Massachusetts; and Caddy Park, a preserved salt marsh with nearby picnic facilities.
