= Charles Josias Wampatuck =

Sachem of the Massachusett tribe

- Died: after 1695
- Other names: Charles Josias, Josias Wampatuck
- Citizenship: Massachusett
- Occupation: sachem
- Years active: ca. 1690s
- Known for: signing deed for the lands in and around Boston and Scituate to English colonists

Charles Josias Wampatuck (died after 1695) was a sachem of the Massachusett tribe in the late 17th century.

== Name ==
The 1695 quit-claim deed to Boston lists "Charles Josias, alias Josias Wampatuck, grandson of Chikataubut." His names are alternatively spelled as Josiah and Wompatuck.

== Family and background ==
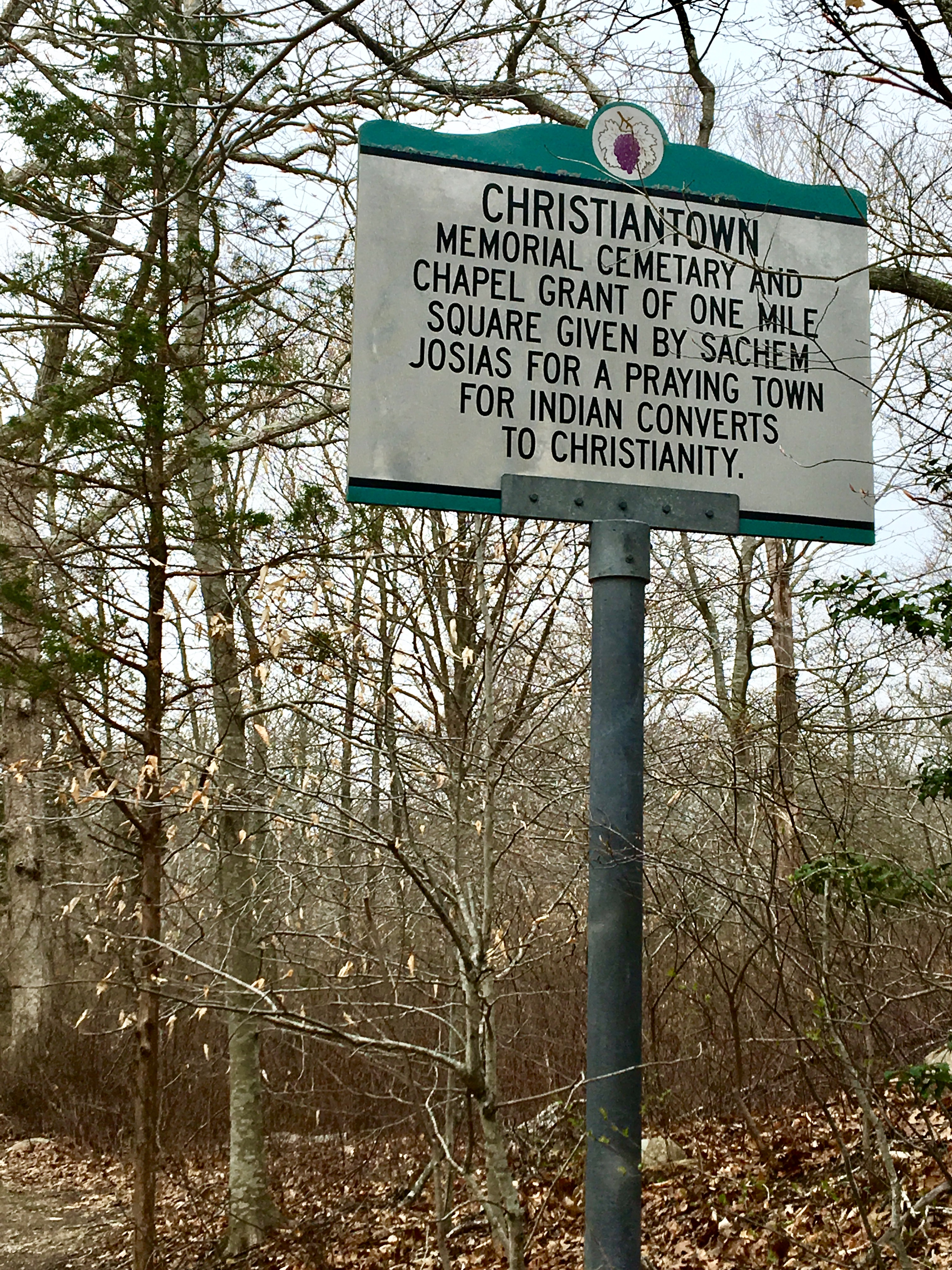

Charles' paternal grandfather was Chikataubut (d. 1633), also written as Chikatawbut. Charles' father was Wampatuck (ca. 1629–1669), also written as Wompatuck, Josias Wampatuck, Josiah Wompatuck, and Josias Sagamore. Wampatuck served as sachem of the Massachusetts tribe until his death in 1669.

== Career ==
After Wompatuck's death, Charles was a minor so a regent acted on his behalf until he came of age.

In 1671, Charles Josiah became sachem. In 1684 and 1685, Charles Josiah Wampatuck signed various deeds and confirmatory deeds affirming his grandfather's transfer of Boston, Stoughton, Dedham, Mansfield, Norton, and other areas to the colonists decades earlier. A deed dated 1686–87 relinquished title of Conhassett lands, present-day Scituate, Massachusetts, was signed "Josias Wampatuck, son and heir to Josias Wampatuck," and he was paid £14.

Wampatuck had been an ally to the British colonists. Historian Samuel Deane wrote that Charles Josiah was the son of Jeremy, son of Josiah Wampatuck, which would make Charles the grandson of Wamputuck as opposed to his son, and Deane dramatically declared, "Charles Josiah (son of Jeremy) was the last of his race."
