= Island effect =

Island effect may refer to:

- Urban heat island, also known as the Heat island effect, in which metropolitan areas are warmer than the surrounding environment
- Nut Island effect, a management principle when teams become isolated and decrease efficiency
- Foster's rule, also known as the Island rule or the Island effect, where island populations of animals change in size

== See also ==
- Galápagos effect
