= Massachusetts Bay (disambiguation) =

Massachusetts Bay is a bay on the Gulf of Maine that forms part of the central coastline of the Commonwealth of Massachusetts, which is one of the states in the United States of America.

Massachusetts Bay may also refer to:

- Massachusetts Bay Colony, an English settlement in North America from 1628 until its merger with Plymouth Colony in 1691 to form the Province of Massachusetts Bay
- Province of Massachusetts Bay, a British colony from 1691 until declaring independence in 1776; one of the thirteen colonies that ultimately became the United States of America
- The Commonwealth of Massachusetts according to a former name used officially until 1781, and used in the Declaration of Independence, the Articles of Confederation, the Constitution of the United States, and the Definitive Treaty of Peace of 1783 between Britain and the United States
- Massachusetts Bay Transportation Authority
