= Haymans Island =

Haymans Island may refer to:

- Hayman's Island, Massachusetts, United States
- Hayman Island, Queensland, Australia
