= Squantum (disambiguation) =

Squantum is a neighborhood in Quincy, Massachusetts.

Squantam may also refer to:

- Squantam NAS, an active naval aviation facility
- Squantum Point Park, a park
- Squantum Victory Yard, a former United States Naval Shipbuilding yard
- Squantum Association, a private club
- Squantum Yacht Club, a yacht club
