= Squantum Yacht Club =

- Burgee
- Short name: SYC
- Founded: 1890
- Location: 646 Quincy Shore Dr, Wollaston, MA 02170 USA
- Website: www.squantumyc.org

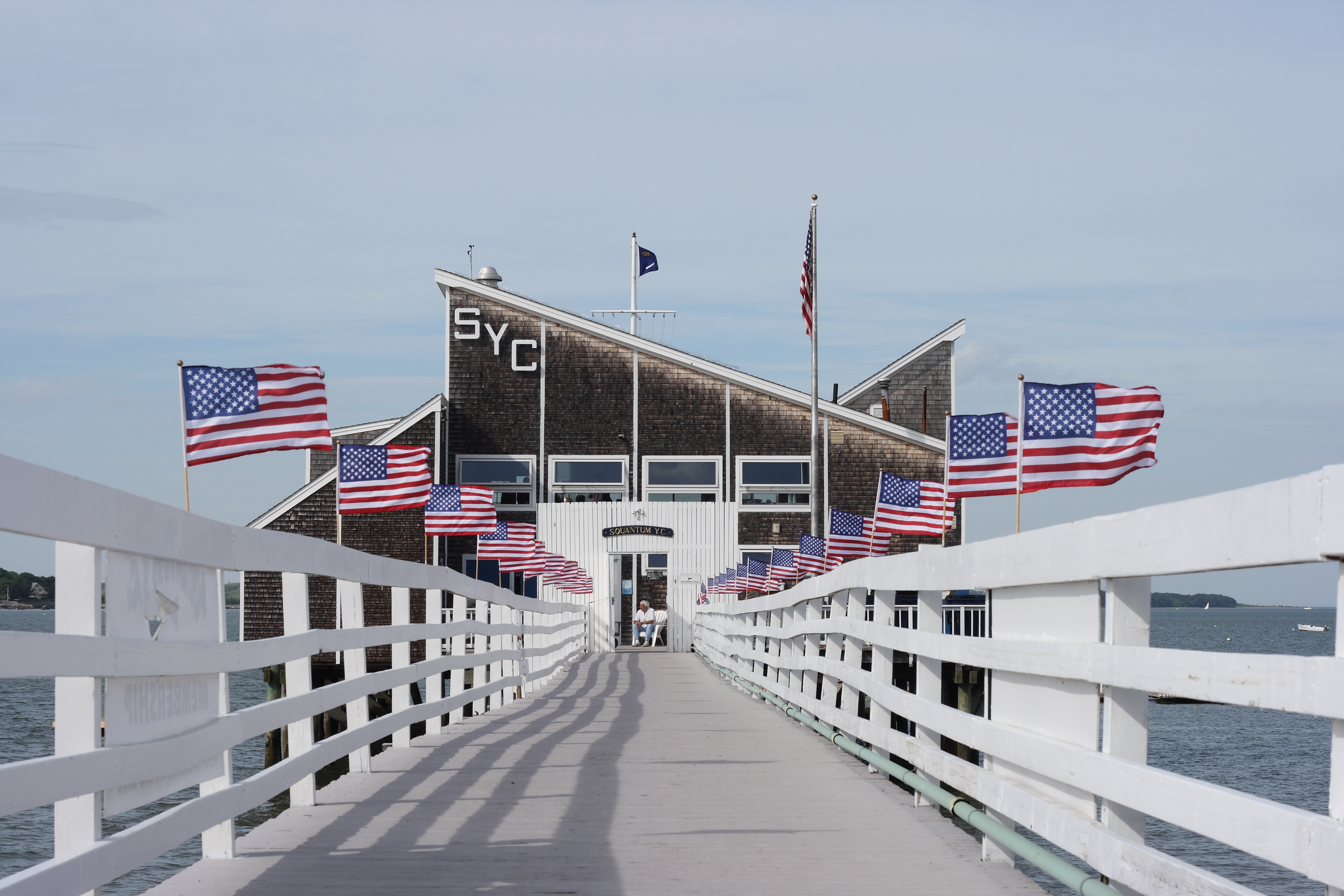
Squantum Yacht Club from Quincy Shore Drive

The Squantum Yacht Club (SYC) was founded in 1890 by like-minded individuals in order to help promote sailing and boatsmanship on Boston's south shore. Located on Quincy Bay at Wollaston Beach, the club is a cooperatively owned venture by both sailors and power boaters, each member contributing both money and time to maintain the ideals of its founders, the club house and its docks. The SYC also hosts the annual Lipton Cup Regatta, each July in which eastern Massachusetts boating clubs and sailing programs compete in a number of races in Quincy Bay.
