= Moswetuset Hummock =

- U.S. National Register of Historic Places
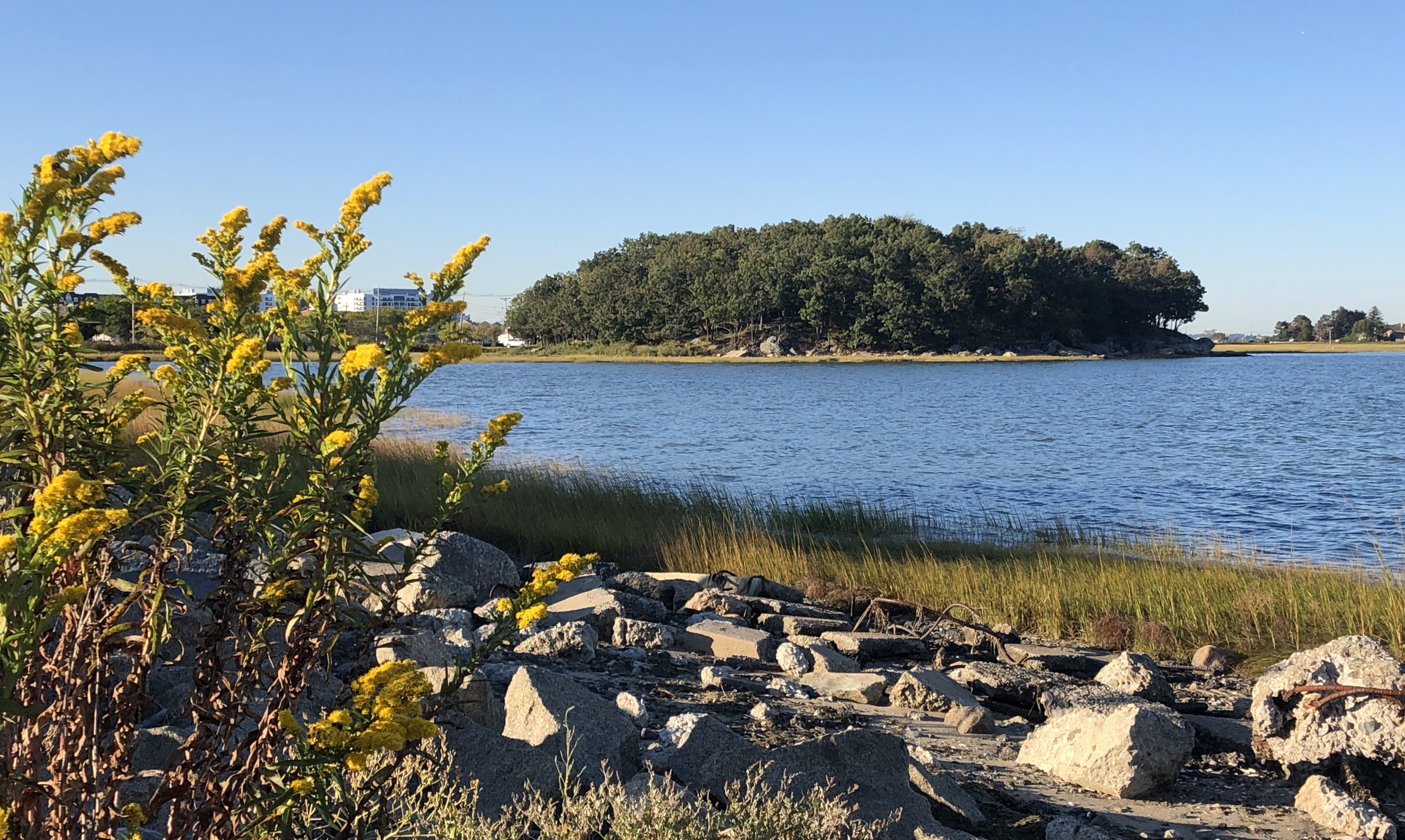
- Moswetuset Hummock

- Location within Massachusetts Location within the United States
- Location: E. Squantum Street, near jct. with Quincy Shore Drive, Quincy, Massachusetts
- Coordinates: 42°17′22″N 71°1′18″W
- NRHP reference No.: 70000094
- Added to NRHP: July 01, 1970

Moswetuset Hummock is a Native American site and the original name of the tribe (Mosetuset) in the region named Massachusetts after them. The wooded hummock in Squantum, Massachusetts, is formally recognized as historic by descendants of the Ponkapoag people.

The location was the seat of the ruling Moswetuset Sac'hem (Native American chief) Chickatawbut. During the warm season he conducted tribal council here. Members of the Moswetuset (Massachusett) tribe for centuries made the shore of Quincy Bay their seasonal home.

Moswetuset Hummock is understood to be the site where Chickatawbut negotiated with Plymouth Colony commander Myles Standish and Tisquantum, a Patuxet tribe guide.

In his 1747 volume A History of New-England, historian Daniel Neal described Moswetuset Hummock as the origin of the name of the indigenous Massachusett tribe. The colonists named the Commonwealth of Massachusetts after them:

The Sachem or Sagamore who governed the Indians in this part of the country when the English came hither, had his seat on a small hill, or hummock, containing perhaps an acre and a half, about two leagues to the southward of Boston, which hill or hummock lies in the shape of an Indian's arrowhead, which arrow-heads are called in their language MOS, or MONS, with O nasal, and hill in their language is WETUSET hence, this great sachem's seat was called Moswetuset, which signifies a hill in the shape of an arrow's head, and his subjects, the Moswetuset Indians, from whence with a small variation of the word, the Province received the name MASSACHUSETTS.

Moswetuset translates to 'shaped like an arrowhead'.

In 1970 Moswetuset Hummock was formally recognized and added to the National Register of Historic Places in Massachusetts. The historic site is also recognized by the Native American descendants known as the Ponkapoag people. Moswetuset Hummock is located on East Squantum Street, the northern end of Wollaston Beach, Quincy Bay.

A hummock is a geological term: by definition they are small and less than fifty feet in height. Earth hummocks, in contrast to ice hummocks, are also known as a small rounded knoll, mound of land, or a hillock. Hummocks are believed to be relict features that were formed under colder conditions when permafrost was likely present in the ground.

== Gallery ==
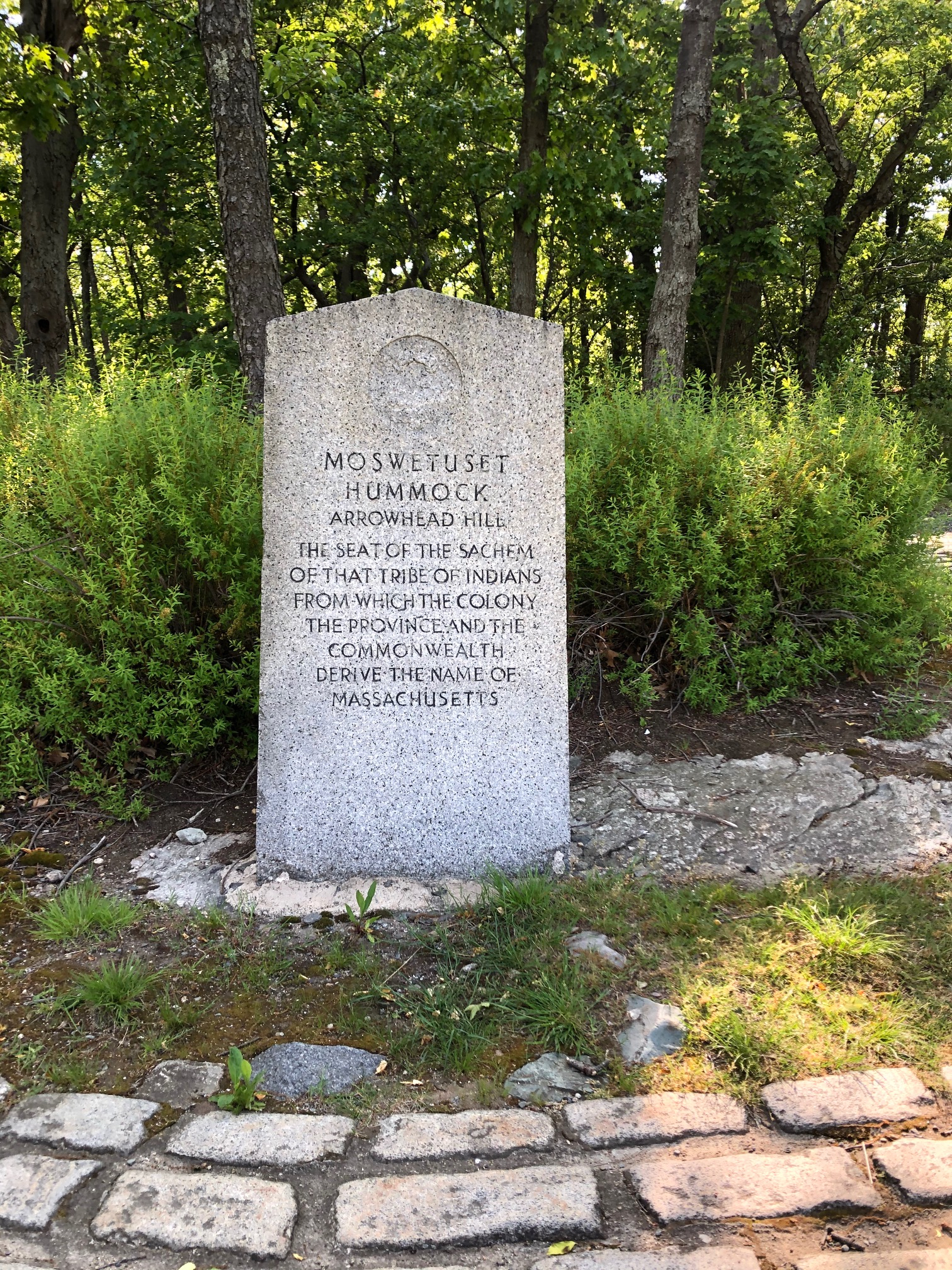
Moswetuset Hummock Commemorative Marker

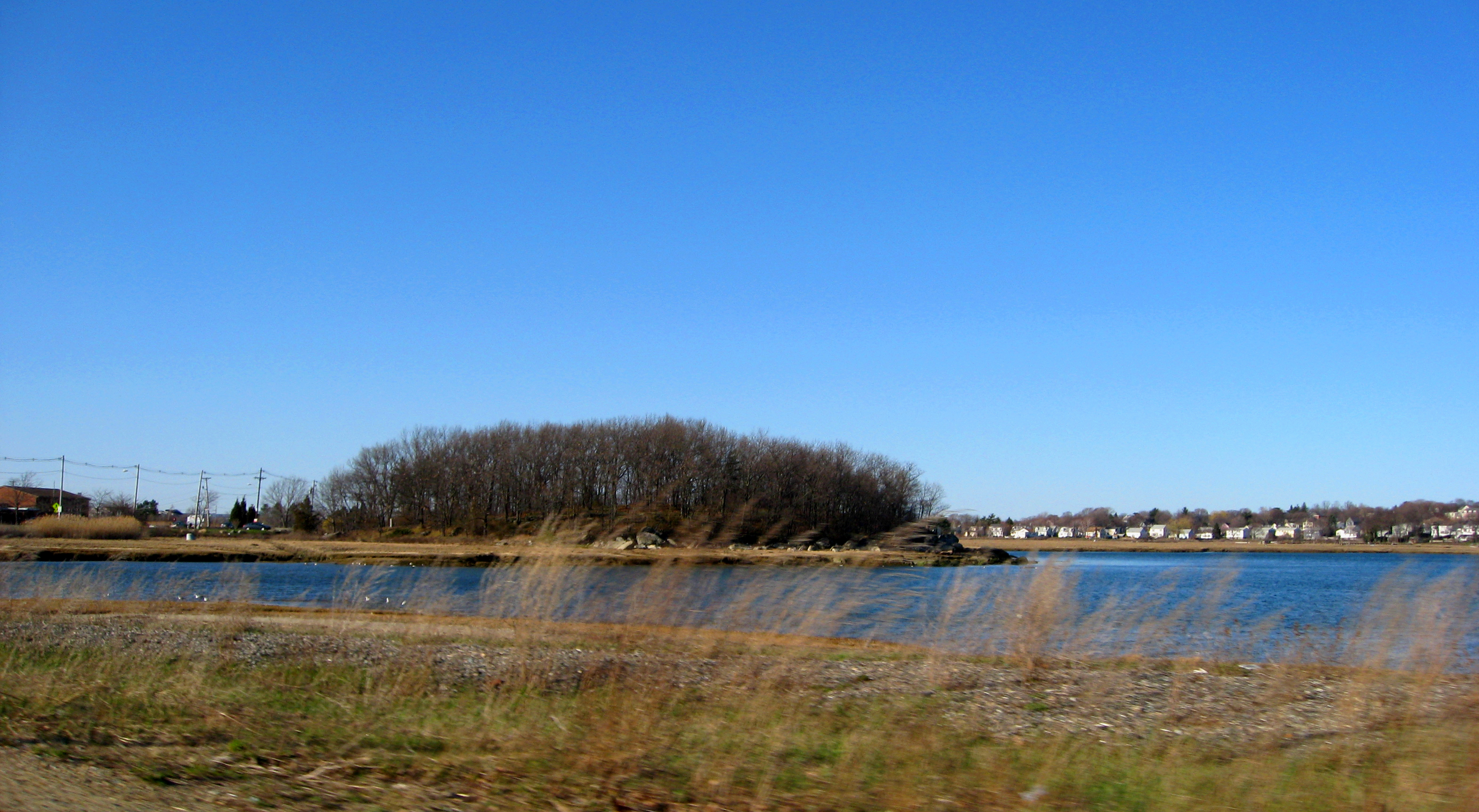
Moswetuset Hummock Shape

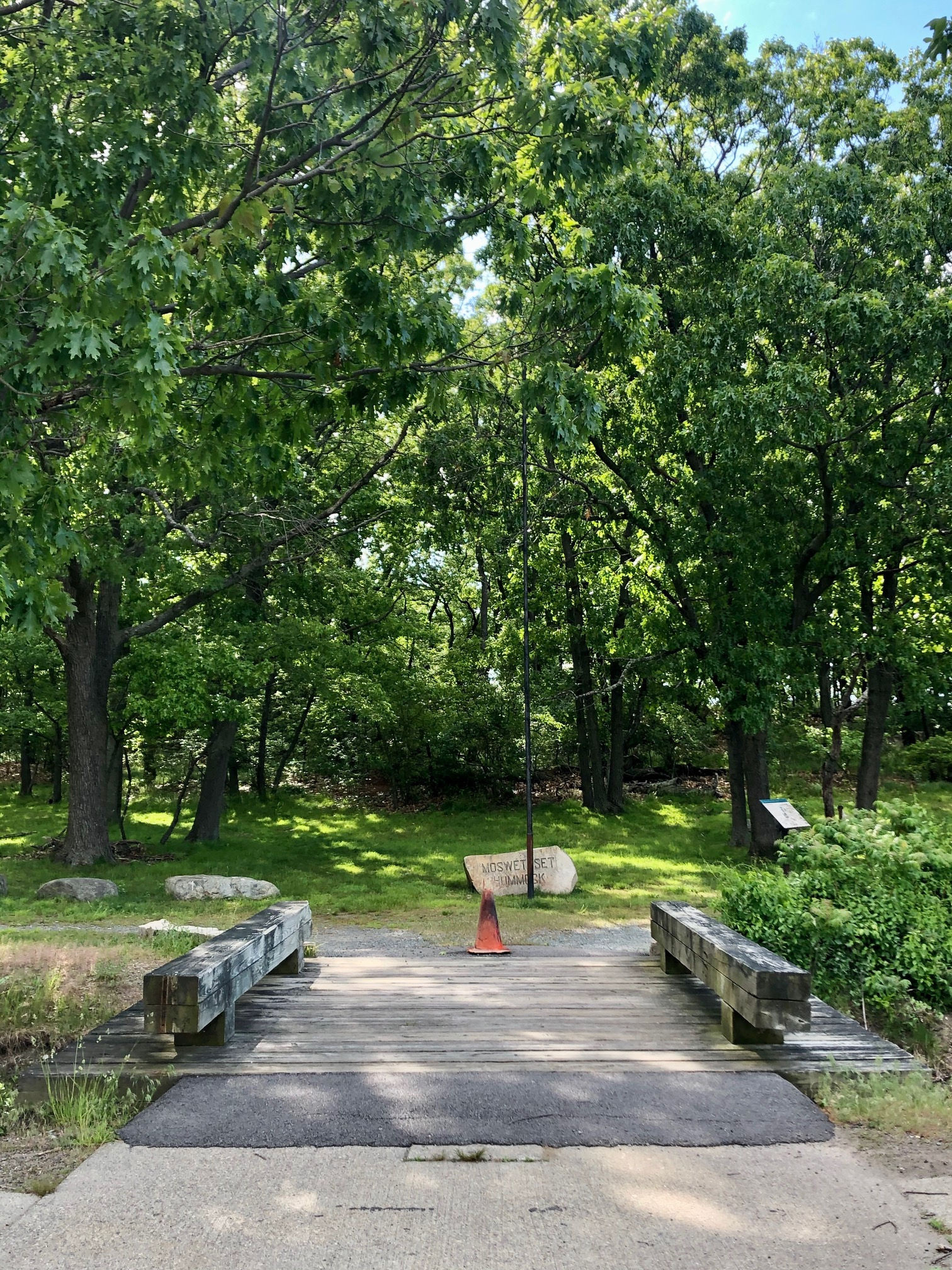
Moswetuset Hummock Bridge

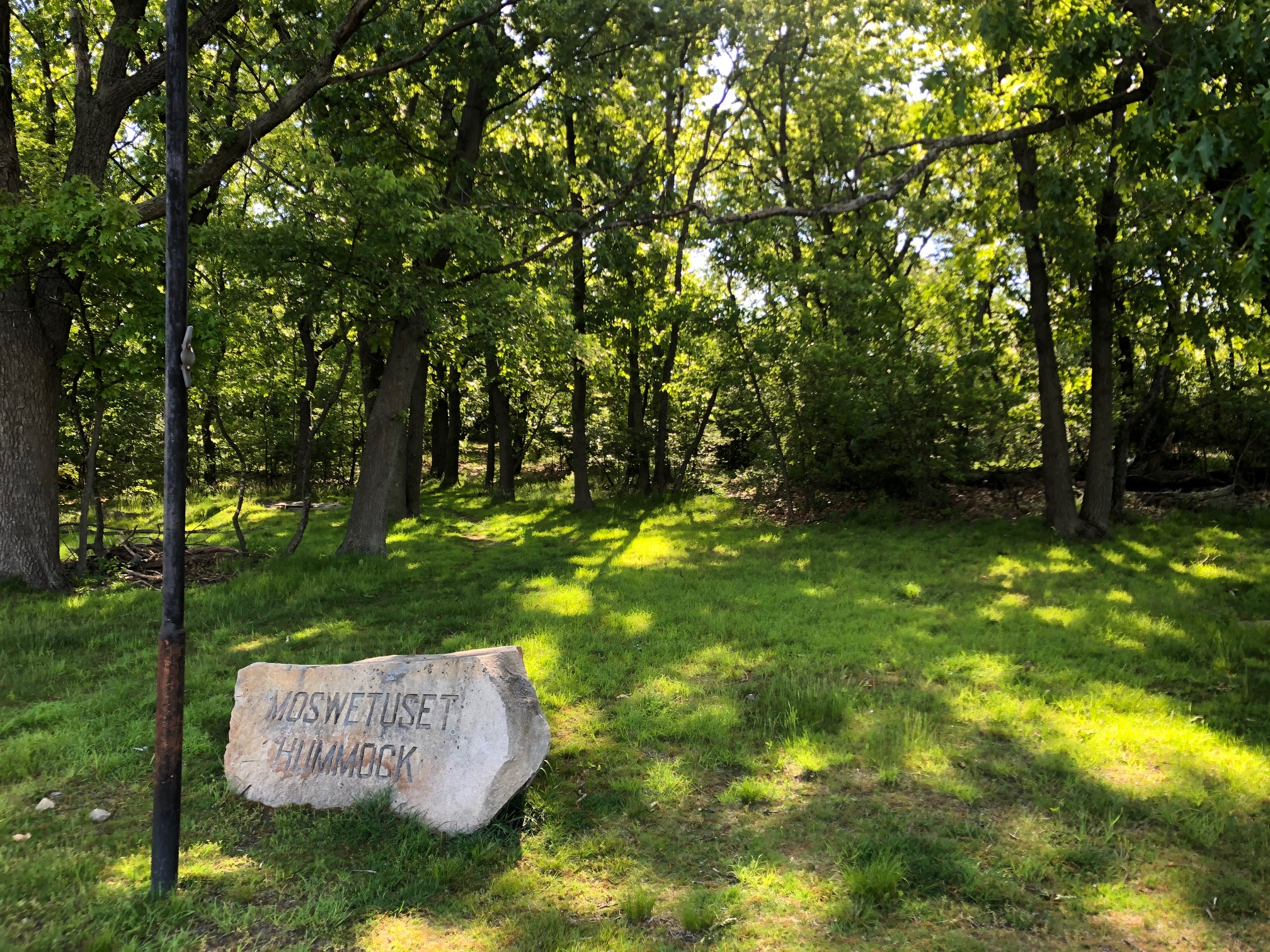
Moswetuset Hummock Rock

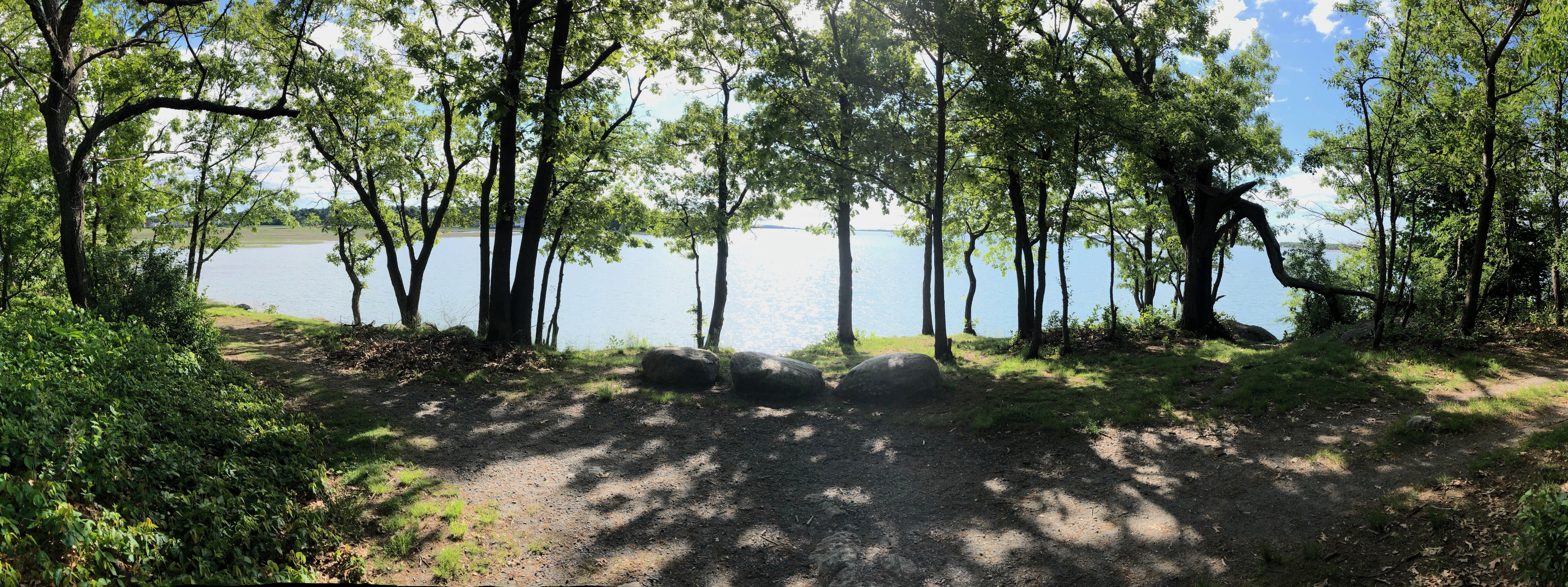
Moswetuset Hummock East

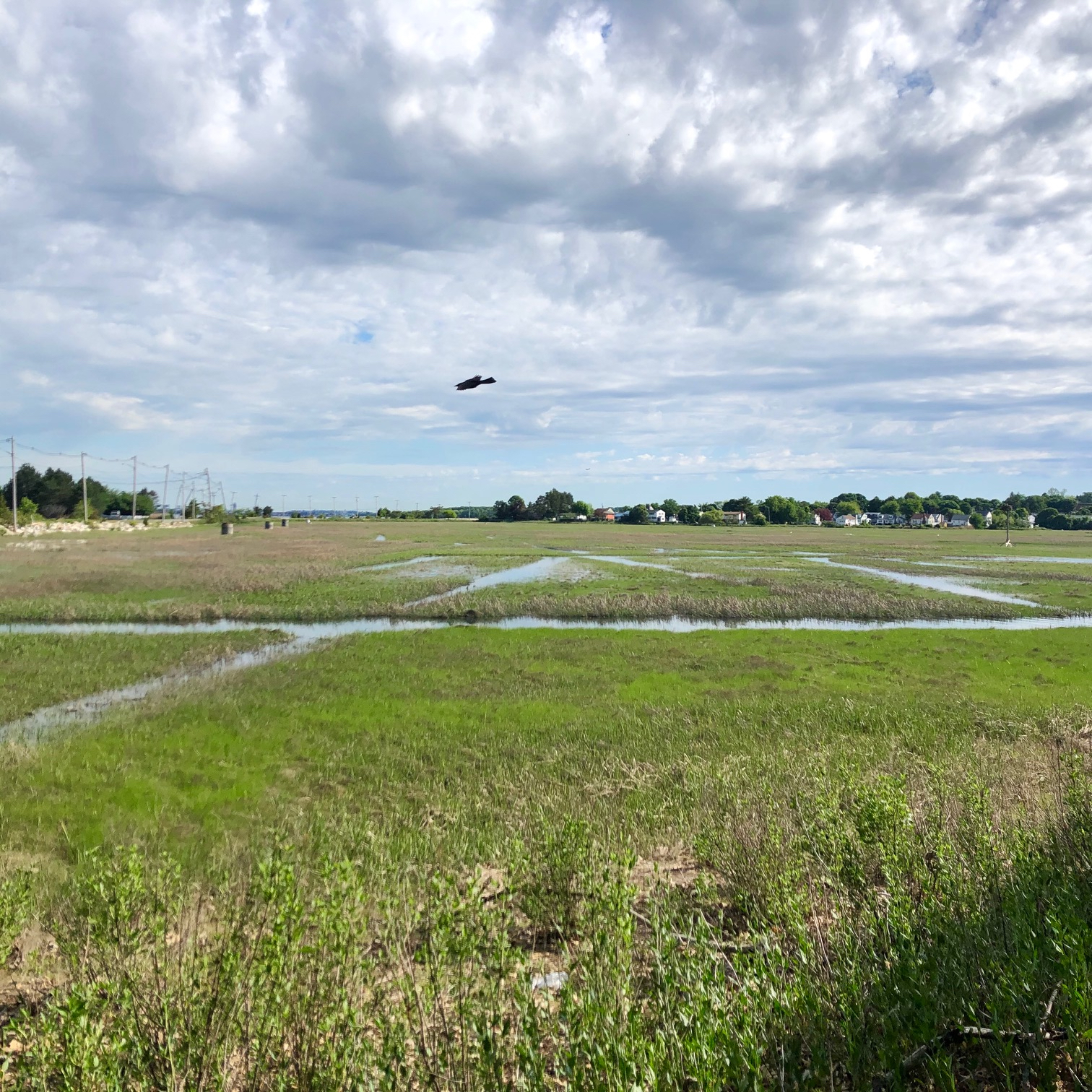
Moswetuset Hummock North

== See also ==
- National Register of Historic Places listings in Quincy, Massachusetts
