= Nut Island =

Coordinates: 42°16′40.14″N 70°57′12.54″W

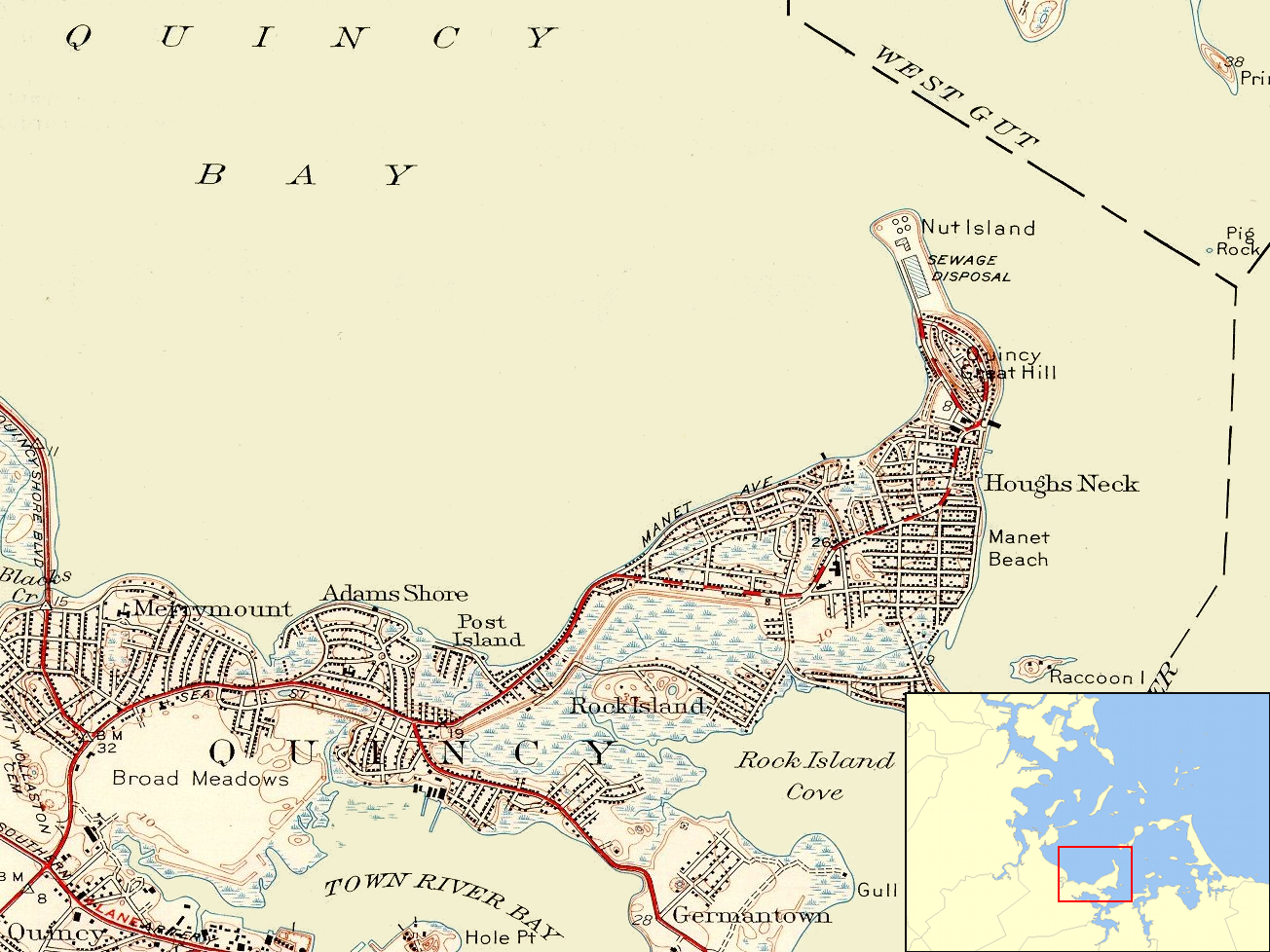
Location of Nut Island with respect to Hough's Neck and Boston Harbor (inset).

Nut Island is a former island in Boston Harbor, part of the Boston Harbor Islands National Recreation Area. The island has been connected through a short causeway to the end of Houghs Neck, becoming part of the mainland of Quincy, Massachusetts.

There are recreational trails, benches and a fishing pier on the small island, with multiple signs showcasing its history. The only building on the island is a Massachusetts Water Resources Authority sewage treatment plant, which screens out grit and large objects before pumping sewage from the south side of the system to the central processing facility at Deer Island through a 4.8-mile (7.7 km) deep-bore tunnel. The Nut Island effect is named after this plant, which experienced management problems in the 1980s.
