= Wollaston Beach =

Public beach in Massachusetts, U.S.

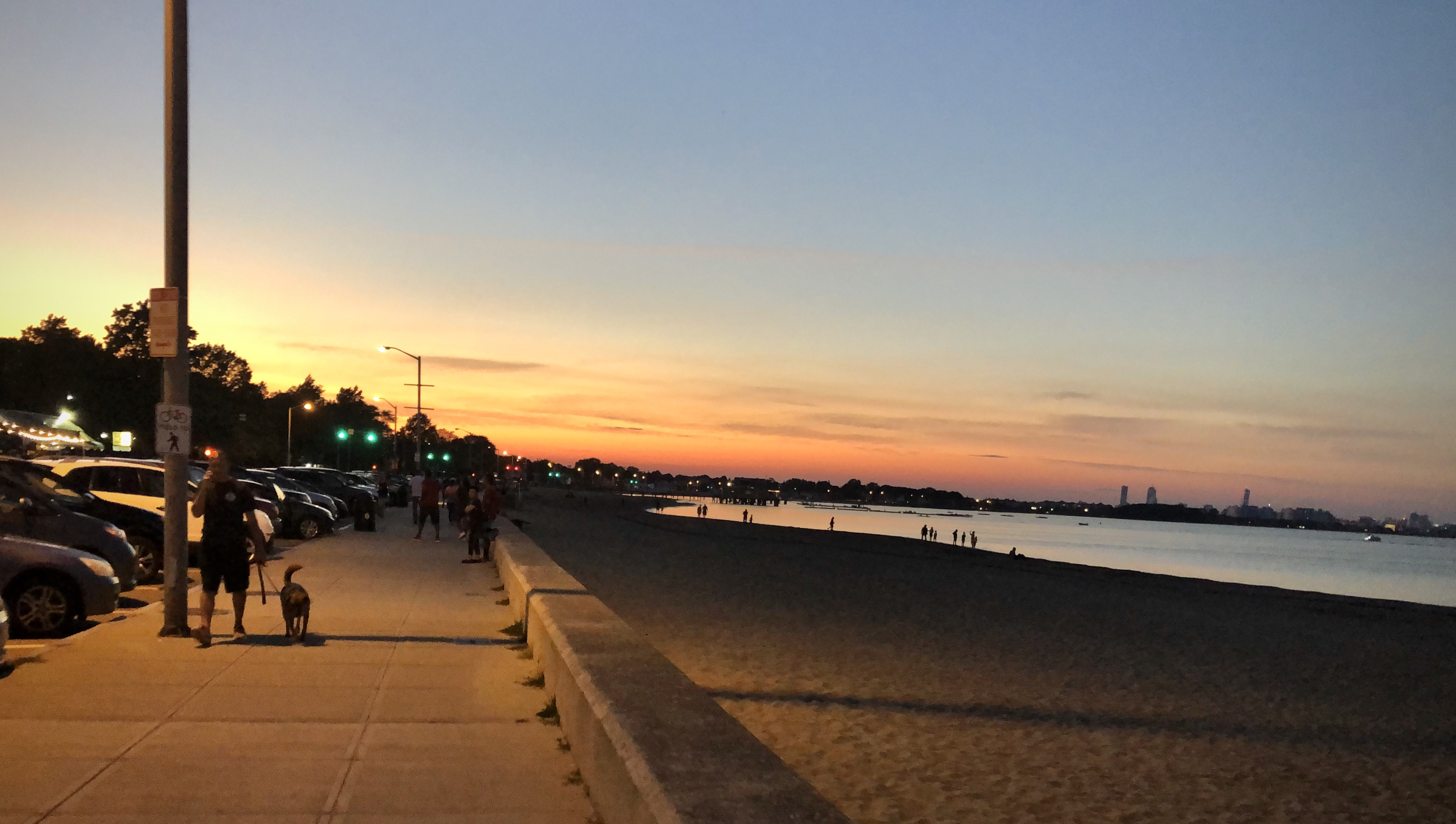
- Sunset at Wollaston Beach
- Interactive map of Wollaston Beach
- Location: Promenade adjacent with beach and Quincy Shore Drive, Quincy, Massachusetts, United States
- Coordinates: 42.27661°N 71.009531°W

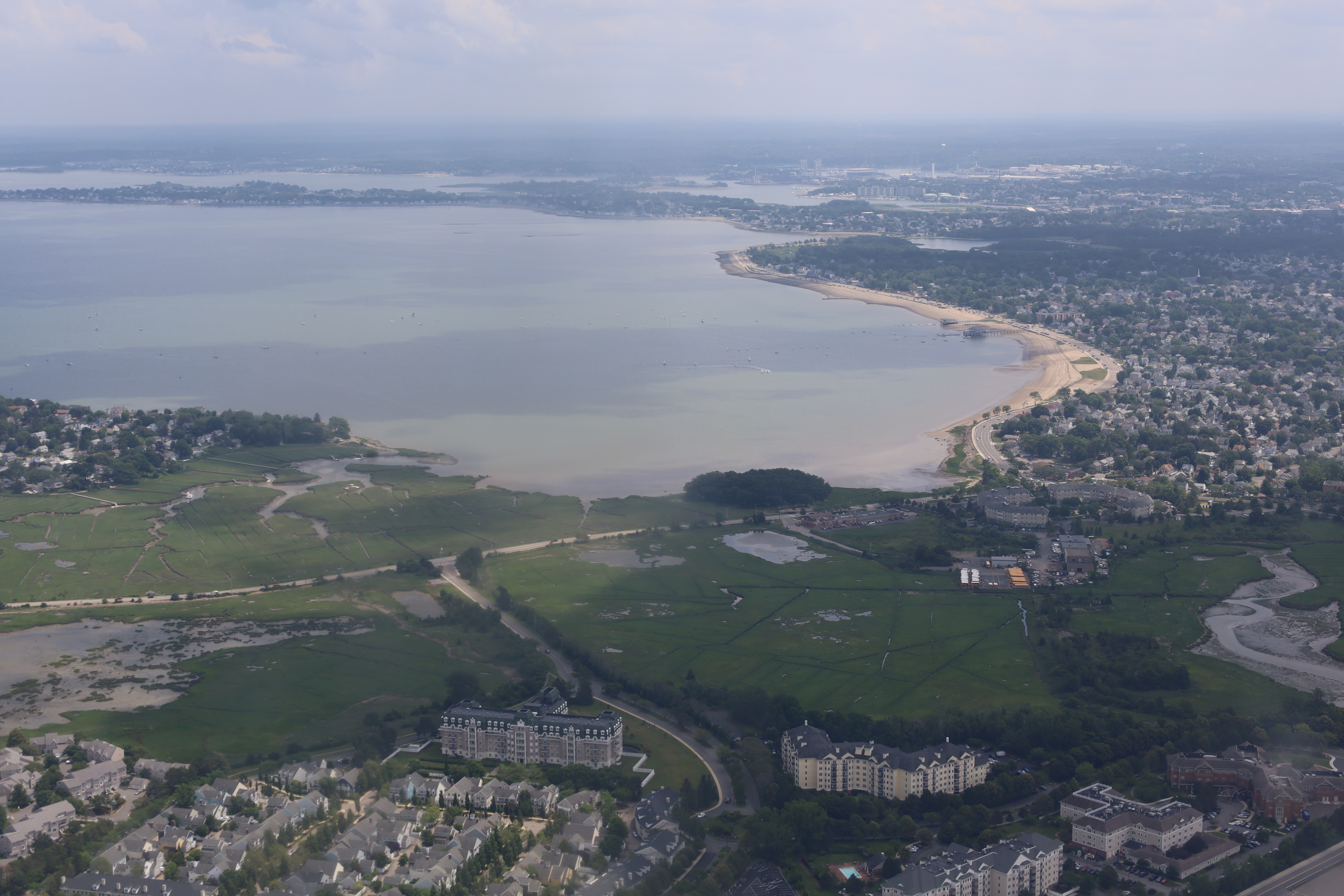
Aerial view in 2023

Wollaston Beach is the largest public beach in the Boston Harbor. The beach is located parallel to Quincy Shore Drive in North Quincy, Massachusetts, which was constructed to provide access to the bay beach for Greater Boston. Wollaston beach expands Quincy Bay forming part of Boston Harbor. The northern end of the beach is the Native American historical site, Moswetuset Hummock which is where the original Moswetuset Sac'hem (Chief) had a tribal council.

Wollaston Beach is now part of the Quincy Shore Reservation which was introduced by the legislative act in 1899. Quincy Shore Drive parallel to the beach was opened on May 30, 1908. It is maintained (waste management) in summer by the Department of Conservation and Recreation (DCR).

Wollaston Beach is the largest in Boston Harbor with roughly 2.3 miles (3.7 km) of shoreline. The promenade stands the entire length of the beach and is often busy with walkers, dog walkers, runners, and casual cyclists. The Wollaston beach promenade has a significant seawall as it is impacted by coastal tides. There are seasonal restaurants that predominately offer battered seafood and become popular on weekends. There is ample parking along the Wollaston Beach promenade. The views from Wollaston beach include Boston, South Boston, Squantum, Houghs Neck, and Nut Island. Boston Harbor Islands are also visible. These islands are; Moon, Long, Georges and Peddocks, Spectacle. The Hull Wind Turbine #1 (200 ft (61 m)) is visible beyond Peddocks. The Hull Wind Turbine #2 (330 ft (100 m)) is visible beyond Houghs Neck.

Based on water quality tests determining levels of enterococcus, currently, the beach is not unacceptable for bathing. This research was conducted in 2019 by the City of Quincy Health Department.

Wollaston Beach has two yacht clubs and is adjacent to the commercial Marina Bay. The southern end of the beach attracts fishing activities. The Squantum Yacht Club and Wollaston Yacht Club have piers to their clubhouse starting at the beach. The Squantum Yacht Club was founded in 1898. The yacht clubs host annual sailing tournaments.

== History ==
In the 1970s, former FBI agent John Connolly reports having convinced the organized crime boss of the Winter Hill Gang, James Bulger (Whitey) to comply to be an FBI informant. The discrete discussion occurring in a secluded parking area at Wollaston Beach.

In the decade of 1980s, Quincy Bay was recorded as was one of the most polluted in the United States of America. This was as a result of the archaic sewerage system dumping approximately 138 tons of waste daily into Boston Harbor. Pollution and water quality had then been less of a concern for the City of Boston and there had been little resistance from the City of Quincy. The outfall pipe was commonly known as the 'bubbler'. Wollaston Beach had to be permanently closed for shellfishing and swimming given the toxicology of the water quality. In 1982, it was determined that the Commonwealth of Massachusetts had knowingly violated and breached the federal Clean Water Act. The City of Quincy successfully sued the Commonwealth for the breach of daily dumping sewerage into Quincy Bay.

In 1990, Wollaston Beach was selected by the Environmental Protection Agency as an Estuary of National Significance given the history. The intent is to monitor sewerage waste, drainage, stormwater waste, and illegal dumping.

Attempts to improve water quality, sanitation and hygiene continue though current tests indicate the water quality is acceptable for bathing.

Despite the environmental challenges, Wollaston Beach is a populated summer destination for enjoying the considerably large promenade.

== Gallery ==
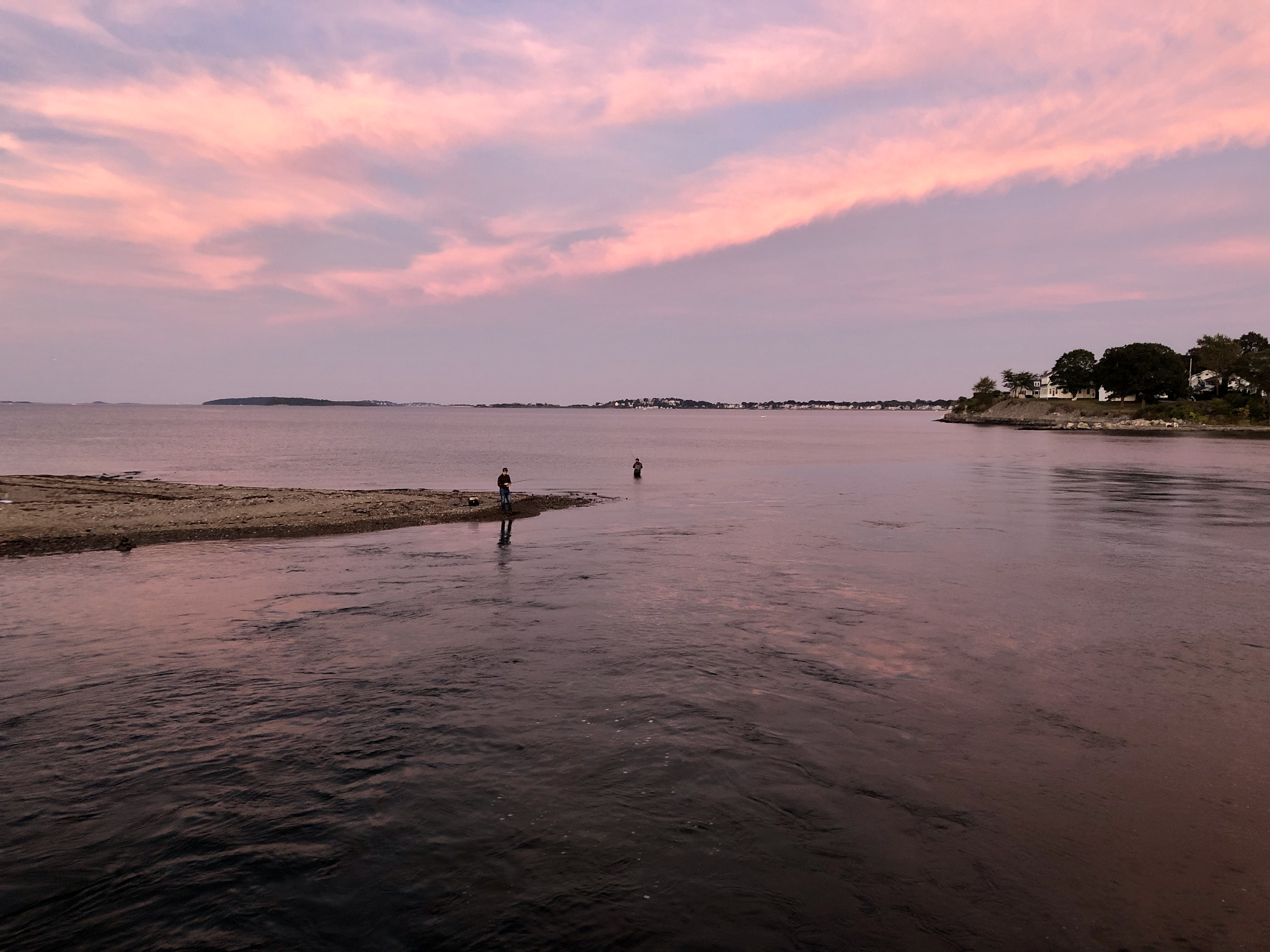
Southern end of Wollaston Beach

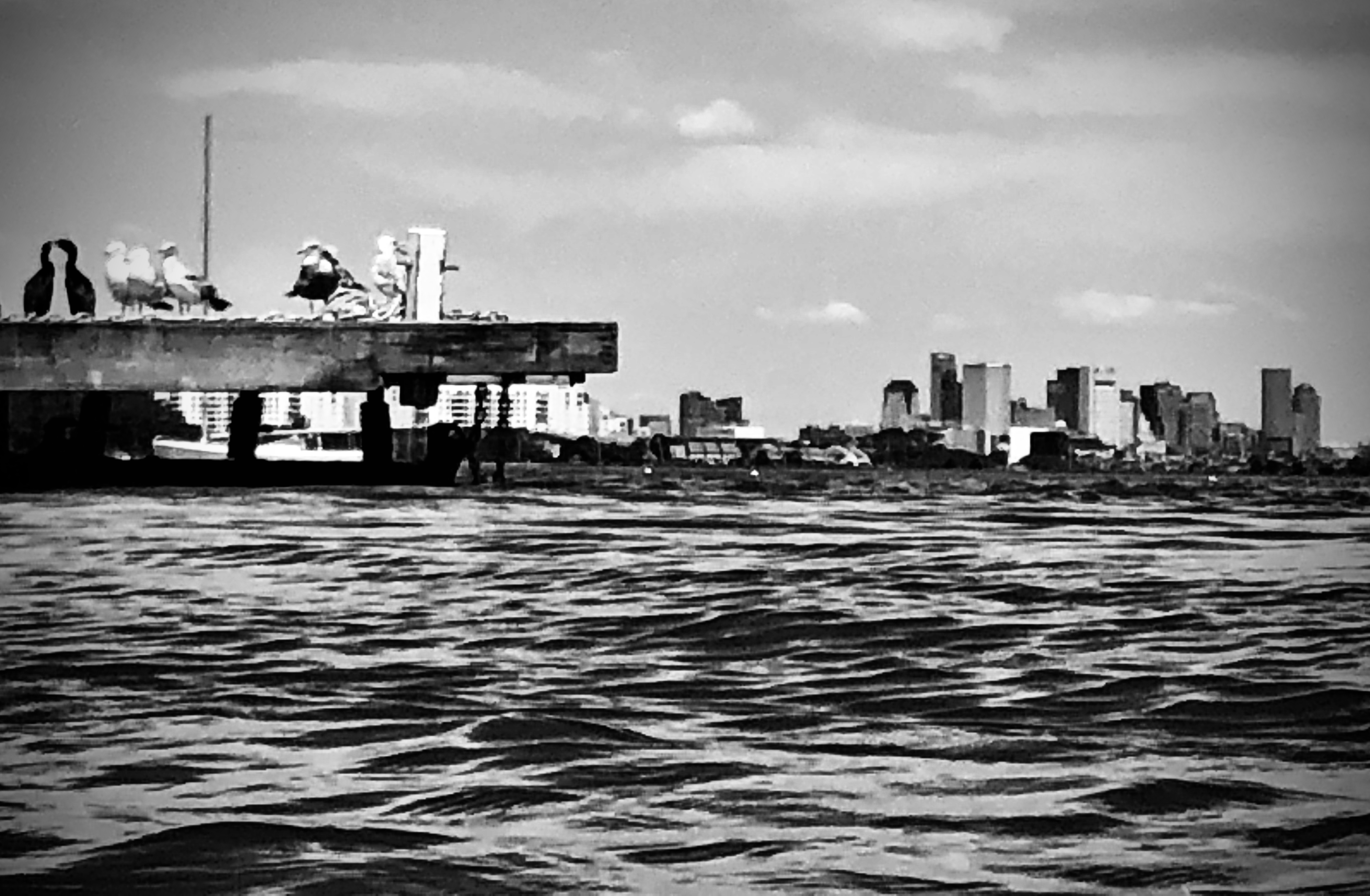
View of the city of Boston

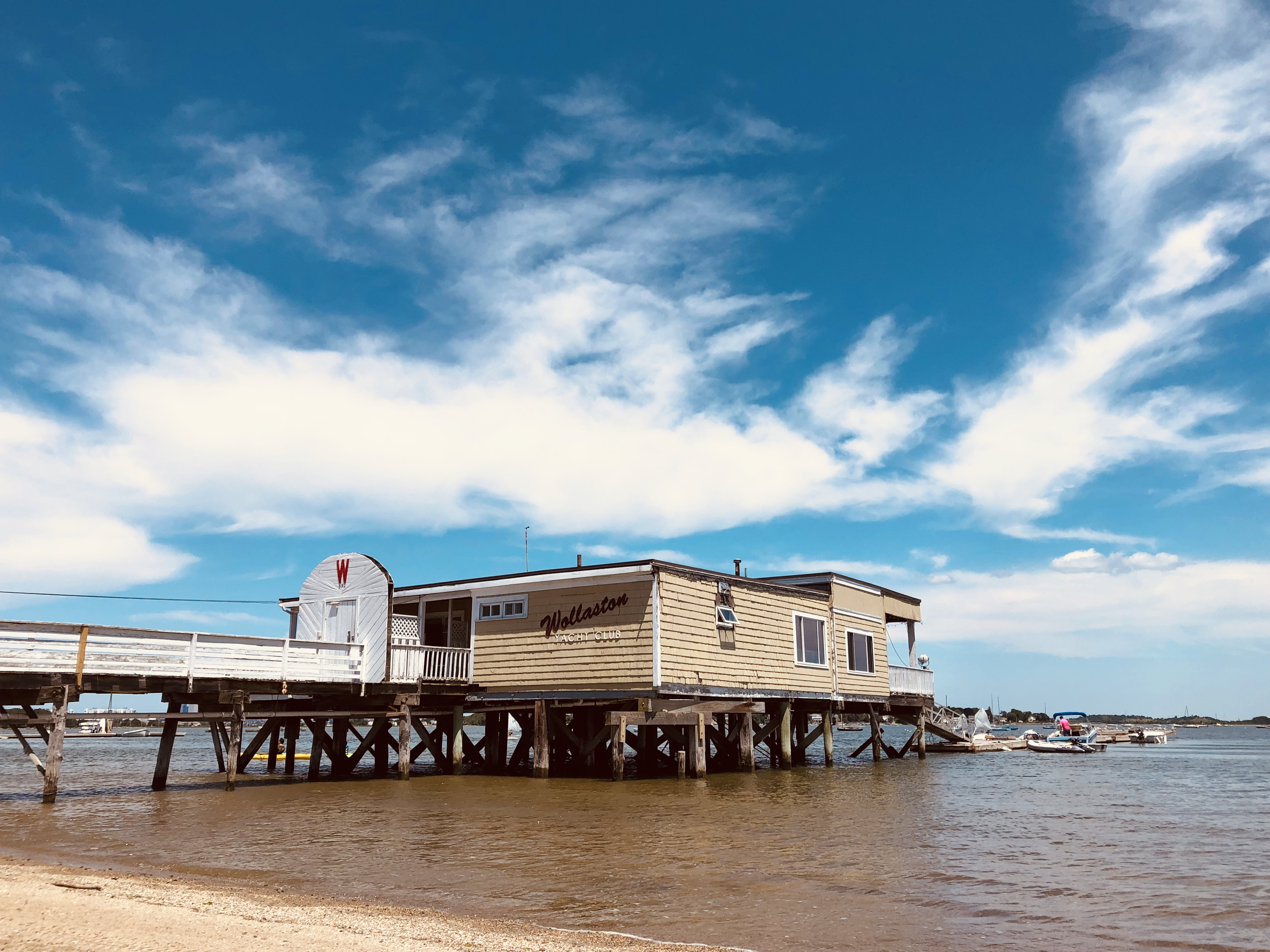
Wollaston Yacht Club

== See also ==
- List of beaches in New England
