= USS Wampatuck =

Tugboat of the United States Navy

History

United States
- Name: USS Wampatuck
- Namesake: Wampatuck (d. 1669), a Native American leader of the Mattakeesett tribe
- Builder: W. F. Stone and Son, Oakland, California
- Completed: May 1921
- Acquired: 28 October 1942
- Commissioned: 1942
- Decommissioned: 6 May 1946
- Renamed: Sea Ranger 1946
- Reclassified: Large harbor tug, YTB-337, 15 May 1944
- Stricken: 21 May 1946
- Fate: Transferred to Maritime Commission 16 August 1946; Laid up in National Defense Reserve Fleet 31 March 1948; Probably scrapped ca. 1955

General characteristics
- Type: Harbor tug
- Displacement: 473 tons
- Length: 141 ft 2 in (43.03 m)
- Beam: 29 ft 9.5 in (9.081 m)
- Depth: 17 ft 6.25 in (5.3404 m)
- Armament: 2 x .50-caliber (12.7-millimeter) machine guns

USS Wampatuck (YT-337) later YTB-337 was United States Navy harbor tug in commission from 1942 to 1946.

Wampatuck was built as the commercial wooden-hulled, single-screw, steam harbor tug SS Sea Ranger at Oakland, California, by W. F. Stone and Son. She was completed in May 1921.

She was acquired by the U.S. Navy for World War II service under a bareboat charter from the Foss Launch and Tug Company of San Francisco, California, on 28 October 1942 and commissioned as harbor tug USS Wampatuck (YT-337). Placed in service at Pearl Harbor, Territory of Hawaii, on 22 December 1942, she served as a harbor tug and performed tow services through the 15 August 1945 end of hostilities with Japan.

During her tour of duty at Pearl Harbor, she was reclassified as a large harbor tug and simultaneously redesignated YTB-337 on 15 May 1944.

Shifting to the United States West Coast after the war, Wampatuck was decommissioned at San Francisco on 6 May 1946. Her name was struck from the Navy List on 21 May 1946. She soon returned to her civilian name SS Sea Ranger.

Transferred to the Maritime Commission at Mare Island Navy Yard, Vallejo, California, on 16 August 1946, Sea Ranger was subsequently assigned to the National Defense Reserve Fleet and laid up at Suisun Bay, Benicia, California on 31 March 1948. She remained there until her name disappeared from the merchant shipping registers in 1955.
