= Chickatawbut =

Massachusett leader

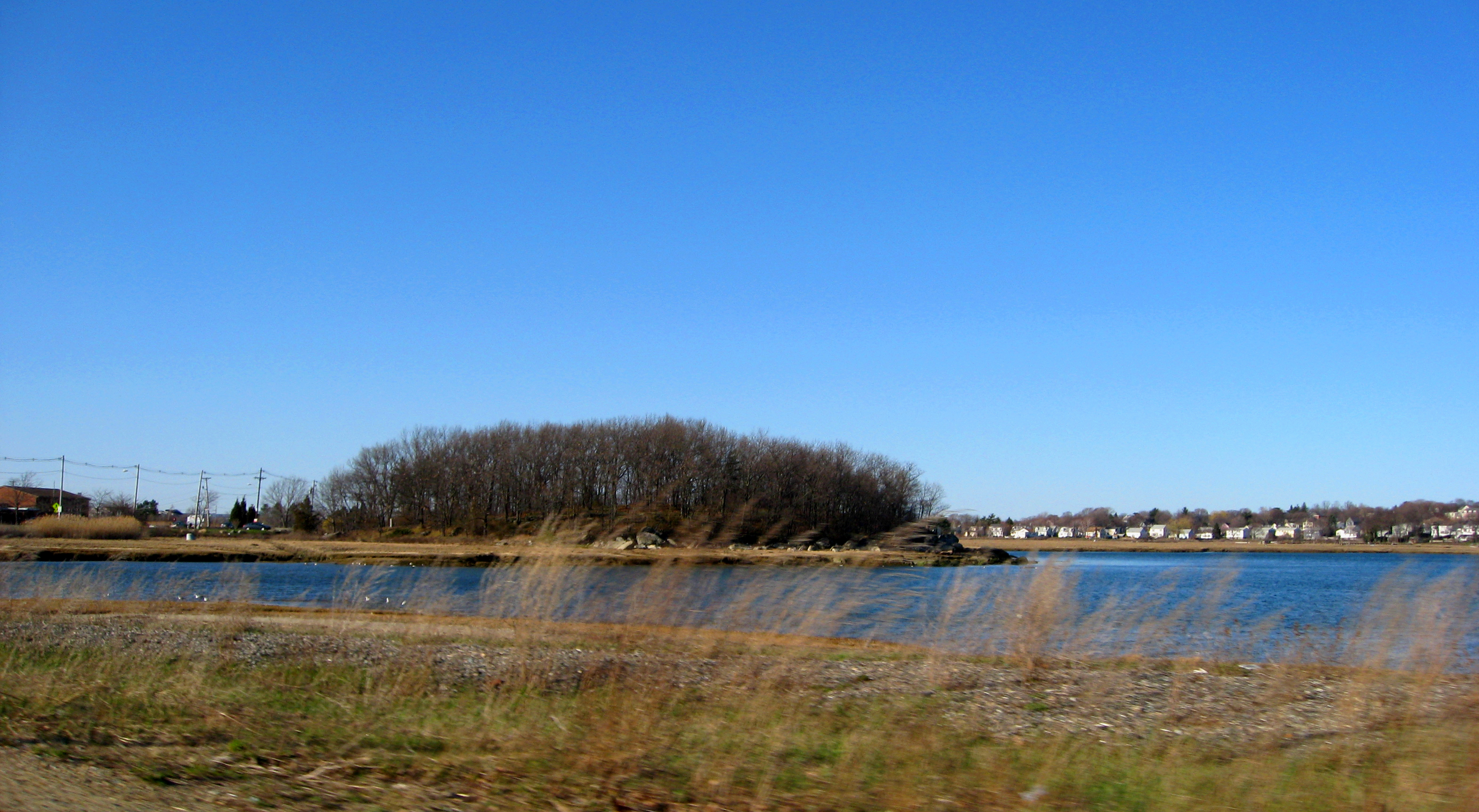
Moswetuset Hummock, one of Chickatawbut's bases

Chickatawbut (died 1633; also known as Cicatabut and possibly as Oktabiest before 1622) was the sachem, or leader, of a large group of Indigenous people known as the Massachusett tribe in what is now eastern Massachusetts, United States, during the initial period of English settlement in the region in the early seventeenth century.

Chickatawbut's home base was Conihasset, near modern Scituate. The sachem's name had many variant spellings in early Massachusetts records. Some argue that he had an alternate name, Oktabiest His brother was Wassapinewat.

Chickatawbut maintained a base at a small hill known as Moswetuset Hummock, located on Quincy Bay in Boston Harbor. In 1621 he was met there by Plymouth Colony commander Myles Standish and Tisquantum, a Patuxet guide. According to colonist Thomas Morton, "Chickatawbut's mother was buried at Passonagessit, and that the Plymouth people, on one of their visits, incurred his enmity by despoiling her grave of its bear skins." Chickatawbut did not get caught by Standish and his forces, although his warrior, Pecksuot, was killed in the hostilities at the Wessagusset Colony in March, 1623.

Chickatawbut died of smallpox in 1633 and was succeeded as sachem by his brother, Cutshamekin. He was succeeded around 1655 by Chickatawbut's son, Wompatuck. As a leader of the Mattakeesett tribe, he became a friend of the English settlers.

In 1650, five Massachusett Indians testified to the tribal bounds over which Chickatawbut had reigned:

Pecunke, Ahivmpum, Catscimah, Webacowett, and Masbanomett doe all afferme, that Chickatawbutt his bounds did extend from Nishamagoquanett, near Duxbery mill [near present-day Cow Tent Hill Preserve off Tremont Street in Duxbury], to Teghtacutt, neare Taunton [Titicut], and to Nunckatatesett, and from thence in a straight linne to Wanamampuke, which is the head of Charles Riuer; this they doe all solomly afferme, saing, God knoweth it to bee true, and knoweth theire harts. Dated the first of the fourth month, 1650. Wittnes : Encrease Nowell, John Eliot, John Hoare.

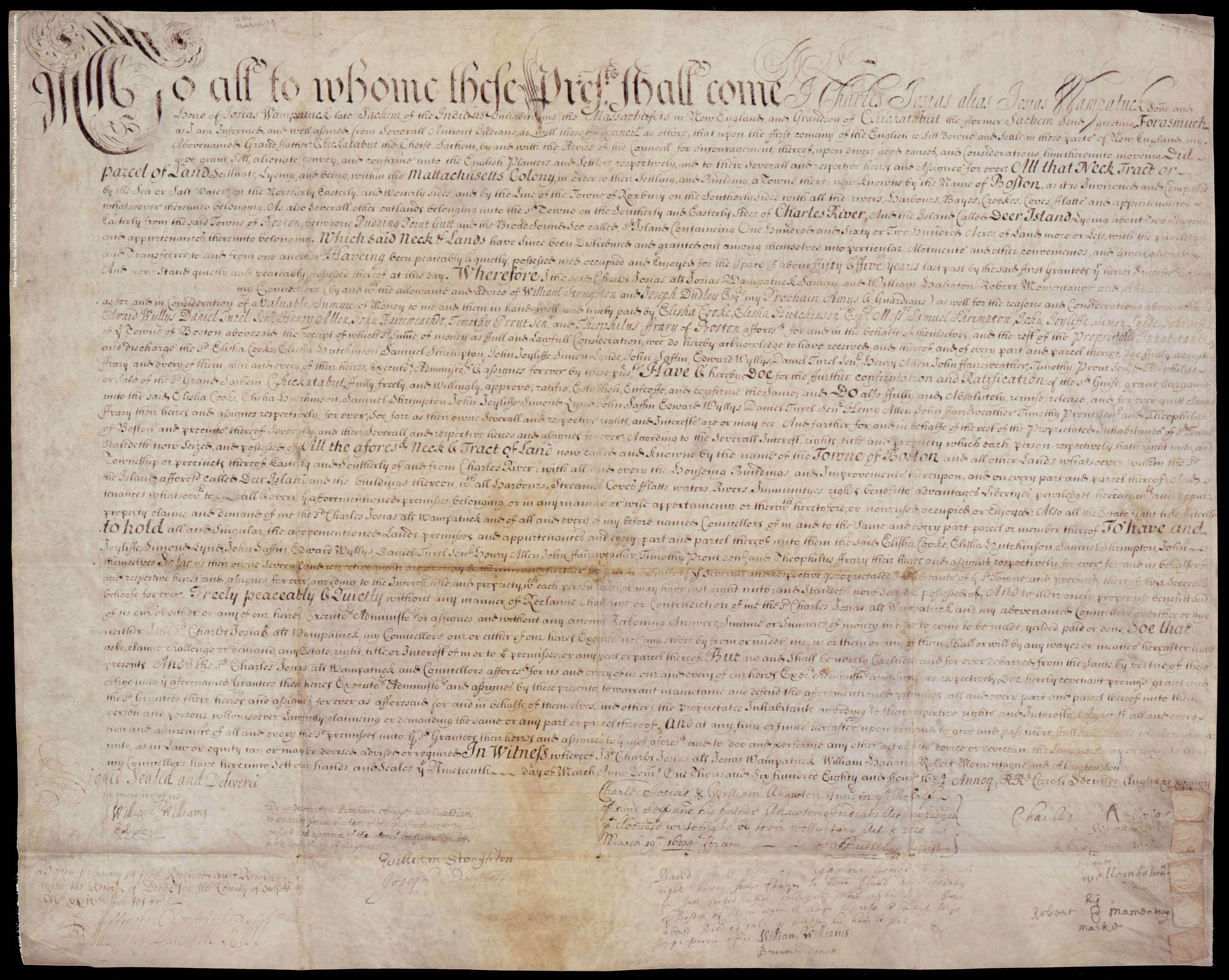
Quitclaim signed by a descendant of Chickatawba to reassure Boston city-fathers that their land was legally obtained from the native political powers in force at the time of its original settlement (September, 1630).

== Legacy and honors ==
In early 1684 the city fathers of Boston sought to secure legal ownership of the Shawmut Peninsula from the descendents of Chickatawbut, the Massachusett sachem at the time William Blaxton first settled on the peninsula, fifty years prior. Such a descendent was located, a sachem named Josias Wampatuck. There is little evidence that this sachem, his grandfather Chickatawbut or any of their people ever inhabited the peninsula, however the lack of formal legal documents involving Indians during the Blaxton sale encouraged the creation of a backdated deed (termed a "quitclaim") which Josias signed on 19 March 1684 (see document at right, and its transcription).

Chickatawbut Road, one of the Blue Hills Reservation Parkways, and Chickatawbut Hill, at 517 feet (158 m) the highest point in Quincy, Massachusetts, are named for this sachem.
