= Quincy Shore Drive =

Parkway in Quincy, Massachusetts

- U.S. National Register of Historic Places
- U.S. Historic district
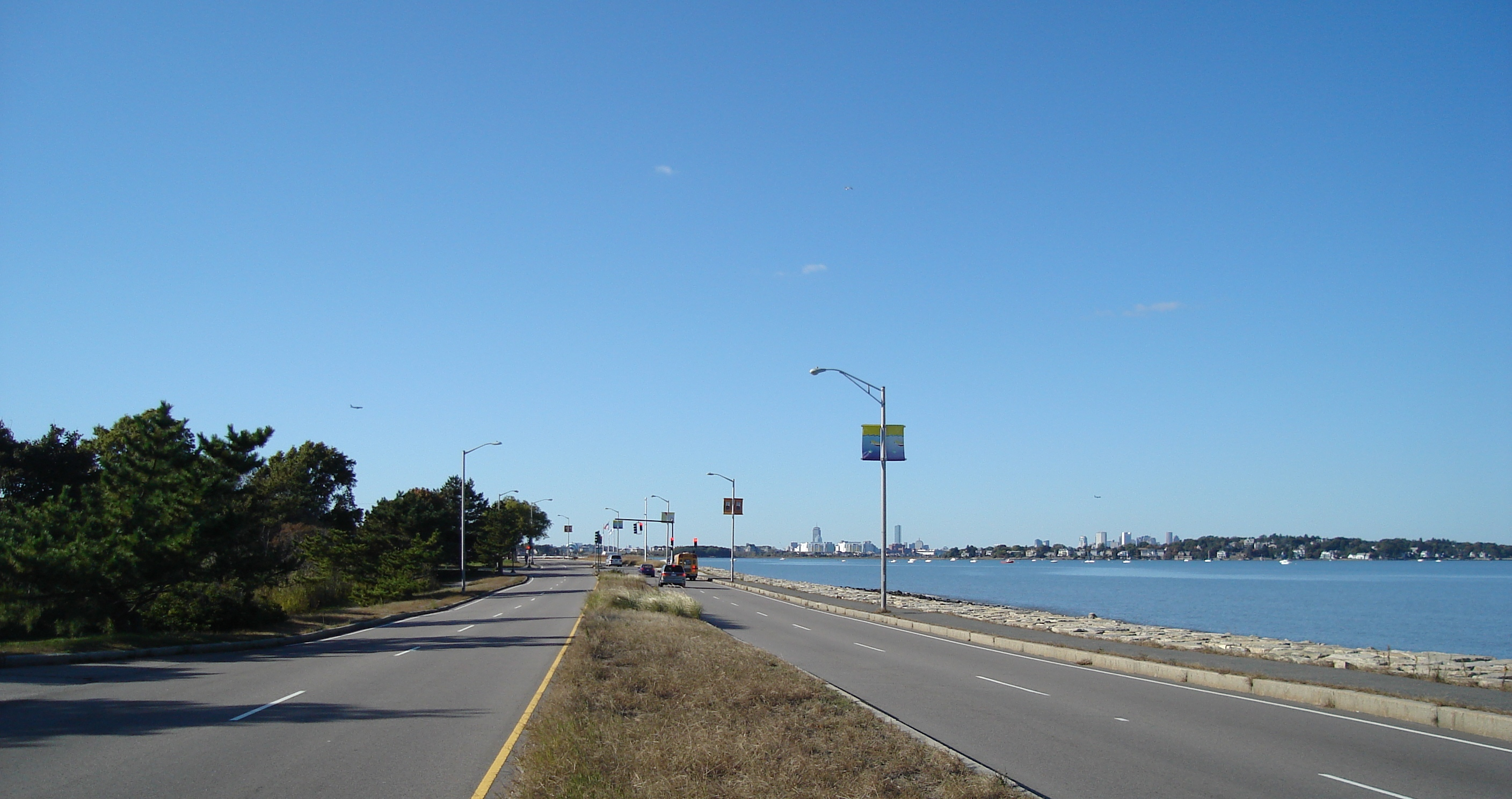

- Location within Massachusetts Location within the United States
- Location: Quincy Shore Drive, Quincy, Massachusetts
- Coordinates: 42°16′41″N 71°0′47″W
- Area: 23 acres (9.3 ha)
- Built: 1903
- Architect: Eliot, Charles; Olmstead Brothers
- MPS: Metropolitan Park System of Greater Boston MPS
- NRHP reference No.: 03000575
- Added to NRHP: June 23, 2003

Quincy Shore Drive is a historic parkway in Quincy, Massachusetts. The road is one of a series of parkways built by predecessors of the Massachusetts Department of Conservation and Recreation, to provide access to parks and beaches in the Greater Boston area. Its development was proposed in 1893 by Charles Eliot, who promoted the development of many of the area's parks and parkways. Planning began in 1897, with land acquisition following around 1900. Construction of the 4-mile (6.4 km) road was begun in 1903 and completed in 1907.

The northern terminus of Quincy Shore Drive is at Hancock Street (Massachusetts Route 3A), just south of the Neponset River. It runs northeasterly for about 1 mile (1.6 km) through a neighborhood area, reaching the Quincy Shore Reservation at a junction with East Squantum Street. This section is four lanes wide (two in each direction), separated by a tree-lined median, with additional trees on the sides of the roadway providing an attractive canopy. At East Squantum Street the road turns southeasterly to follow the shore for about 2 miles (3.2 km). The inland side of the roadway is lined primarily with houses, while the shore side provides angled parking and beach access, and provides dramatic views of Boston and outer Boston Harbor. This segment is also four lanes, divided by a grassy median.

After passing Fenno Street, the road enters Wollaston Beach Reservation, a city-owned park, which it passes through until it crosses over Black Creek and reaches Furnace Brook Parkway, which provides access to the Blue Hills Reservation. It then runs southerly, away from the shore and through a residential area, reaching its southern terminus at Sea Street.

The road was listed on the National Register of Historic Places in 2003.

== See also ==
- National Register of Historic Places listings in Quincy, Massachusetts
