= Wompatuck =

Wompatuck (ca. 1627 - 1669), also spelled Wampatuck, was sachem, of the Mattakeesett band of Massachusett Indians.

== Names ==
Wompatuck was also known as Wampatuck, Josias Wampatuck, and Josiah Sagamore. Wampatuck translates to mean "snow goose" in the Wampanoag language. It has also been ascribed by the City of Braintree, MA and Braintree school mascot debaters to the translation of “snow deer”, however a definitive Wampanoag tribal translation citation is required to clarify this dual or confusing etymology.

== Family ==
Wampatuck's father was the sachem Chikataubut. After Chikataubut died of smallpox in 1633, Wompatuck's uncle, Cutshamekin succeeded as sachem and helped to raise Wompatuck.

== Career ==
After Cutshamekin died around 1655, Wompatuck succeeded him and likewise became an early Native American ally of British colonists. Like his father and uncle, he sold the British colonists the land upon which the city of Boston, Massachusetts, was established in 1629 and other surrounding towns were established.

After a harsh attack on his tribe by the Haudenosaunee (or Iroquois) in 1665, Wompatuck organized a great retaliatory expedition, involving several Massachusett tribes with 600 or 700 warriors, against Mohawk's capital, Gandaouaguè. Returning to Massachusetts, his column was ambushed and he was slain in 1669 when he led a force of his warriors in an attack upon the Mohawks. Wompatuck's son, Charles Josias Wampatuck, became sachem after his death.

== Namesakes ==
Two United States Navy ships – the armed tug USS Wompatuck (YT-27), in commission from 1898 to 1931, and the harbor tug USS Wampatuck (YT-337), later YTB-337, in commission from 1942 to 1946 – have been named for Wompatuck.

Wompatuck State Park located in Hingham, Massachusetts is also named after Wompatuck.
