= Massachusetts Bay =

Bay on the Atlantic Ocean

Coordinates: 42°22′30″N 70°44′58″W

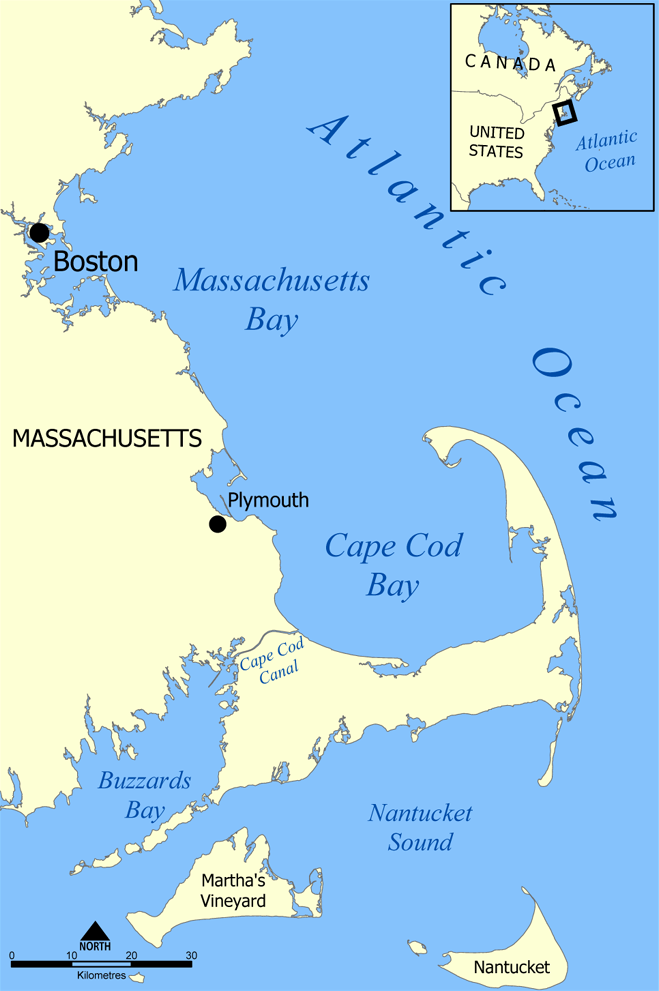
- Bays of Massachusetts

- Location within the United States
- Location: United States
- Ocean/sea sources: Atlantic Ocean
- Basin countries: United States

Massachusetts Bay is a bay on the Gulf of Maine that forms part of the central coastline of Massachusetts, United States.

== Description ==
The bay extends from Cape Ann on the north to Plymouth Harbor on the south, a distance of about 42 miles (68 km). Its northern and southern shores incline toward each other through the entrance to Boston Harbor, where they are about five miles apart. The depth from the base of the triangle to Boston Harbor is about 21 miles (34 km). The westmost point of the bay is at the city of Boston.

The northern shore of Massachusetts Bay is rocky and irregular, but the southern shore is low, marshy, and sandy. Along the shores are a number of capes and headlands, and off the coast a number of small islands, especially in the entrance to Boston Harbor. The principal inlets are: on the north coast, Gloucester Harbor, Nahant Bay, Salem Harbor, Marblehead Harbor, and Lynn Harbor, and on the west, Boston Harbor, Dorchester Bay, and Quincy Bay (the two latter being part of the Outer Boston Harbor), and on the south coast, Hingham Bay. Massachusetts Bay is itself part of the Gulf of Maine, which extends from Nova Scotia south to Cape Cod Bay. Cape Cod Bay is sometimes considered to be part of Massachusetts Bay. Under this interpretation, the name "Massachusetts Bay" denotes the entire rectangular area of ocean between Cape Ann and Cape Cod.

In 1994 the Massachusetts Bay National Estuary Program's Shellfish Bed Restoration Program grew out of the Bluefish River restoration project in Duxbury Massachusetts. The Mass CZM'S Southshore Regional Coordinator, Robert L. Fultz brought together local, regional, state and federal partners to complete this project. The program was then expanded for the entire Mass Bays program and adopted by the Gulf of Maine National Estuary Program. The Shellfish Program's goal was to address coastal non-point source pollution by restoring high visibility nearshore shellfish beds.Its success was based on recognizing that environmental restoration required a partnership of fragmented governmental jurisdictions, expertise and resources. The program has morphed into the Coastal Pollution Remediation Program (CPR) and Mass Bay Estuary Program funding regional staff engaged in coastal environmental restoration.

== Massachusetts Bay Disposal Site ==
The Massachusetts Bay Disposal Site in deep water off the coast has been used for ocean dumping, to dispose of munitions, dredged material, rock and construction debris and sunken vessels. Chemical warfare munitions were dumped between 1919 and 1970, and hundreds of thousands of tons of surplus artillery and munitions were dumped after World War II. The majority later washed up on shore. Most of them are inert unexploded ordnance, but occasionally they are live. Fishermen have brought a torpedo into Provincetown, a depth charge into Gloucester, and mustard munitions into New Bedford.
