= Hangman Island =

Island in Massachusetts, United States

Coordinates: 42°17′24.25″N 70°58′14.28″W

Hangman Island, also known as Hayman's Island, is an island in the Quincy Bay area of the Boston Harbor Islands National Recreation Area. The island is a barren outcrop of bedrock, with a permanent size of half an acre rising to only three feet above sea level, plus an intertidal zone of a further 5 acres (20,000 m^{2}). Access is by private boat only.

The source of its current name has a hazy history. On a 1775, London chart, this island was labeled Hayman's Island and shows a greater area than presently exists. There is no historical evidence that this island was used as a location for hanging criminals. During the American Civil War, targets were placed on the island for artillery practice for troops training at Camp Adams. In 1882, several fishermen built fishing shacks on Hangman Island and were reported to have cultivated a vegetable garden among the rocks.
