= Dorothy Q Apartments =

Historic apartment house in Quincy, Massachusetts

- U.S. National Register of Historic Places
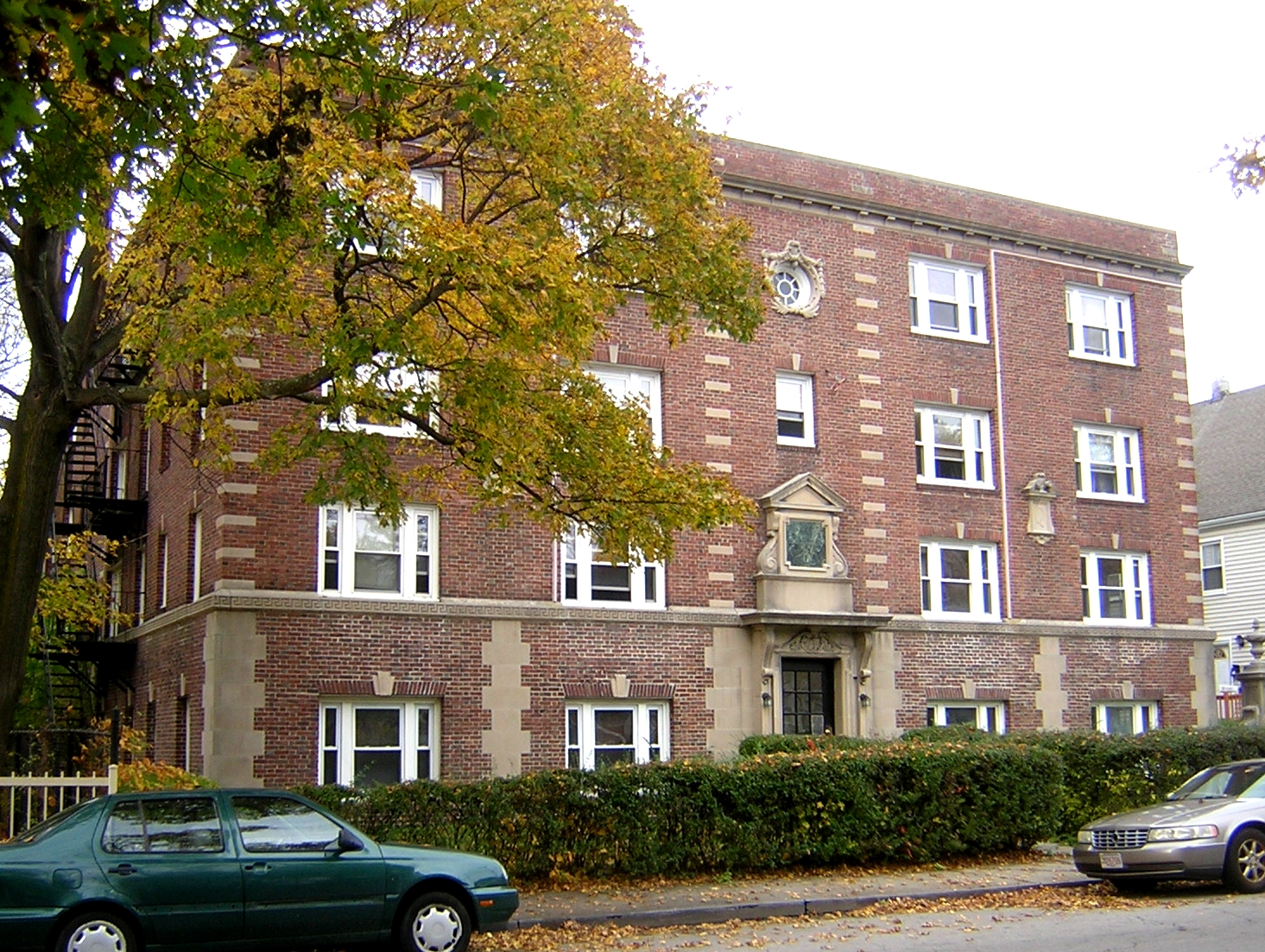

- Location within Massachusetts Location within the United States
- Location: 36 Butler Rd., Quincy, Massachusetts
- Coordinates: 42°15′30″N 71°0′24″W
- Area: 0.3 acres (0.12 ha)
- Built: 1929; 97 years ago
- Architect: Graves & Epps
- Architectural style: Colonial Revival
- MPS: Quincy MRA
- NRHP reference No.: 89001322
- Added to NRHP: September 20, 1989

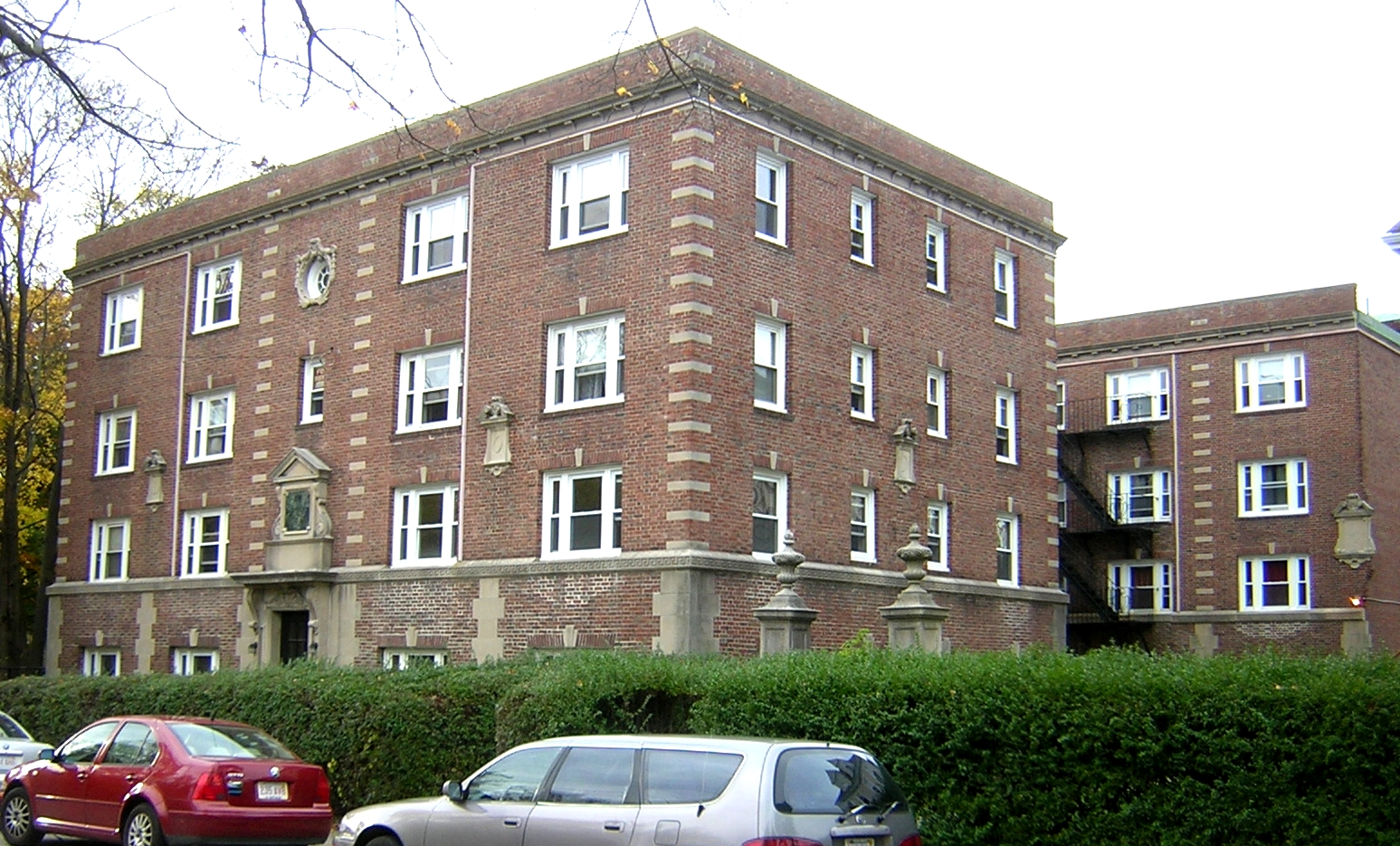

The Dorothy Q Apartments is an historic apartment house at 36 Butler Road in Quincy, Massachusetts. It is a five-story brick Colonial Revival structure, consisting of two rectangular blocks joined at one end into a U shape. Its trim elements are in limestone, and include corner quoining, keystones over the windows, and a modillioned cornice. The complex was designed by Graves and Epps and built in 1929, during a period of rapid growth in the city. It is named for the Dorothy Quincy Homestead, which is next door.

The building was listed on the National Register of Historic Places in 1989.

== See also ==
- National Register of Historic Places listings in Quincy, Massachusetts
