= Houghs Neck =

Peninsula in Massachusetts, USA

Coordinates: 42.2667°N 70.9578°W

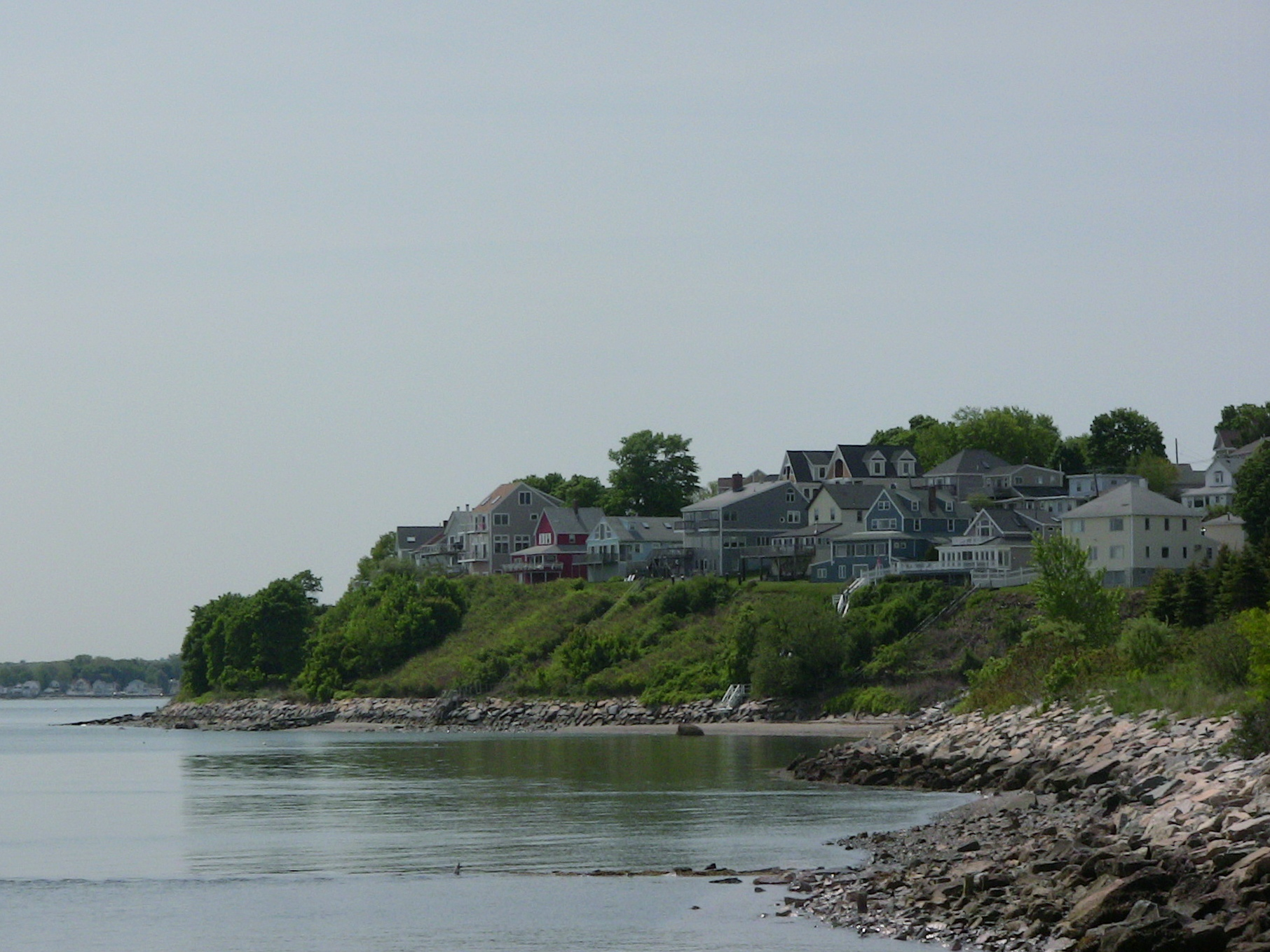
View looking SSW from Nut Island toward homes on Great Hill in the Houghs Neck neighborhood of Quincy, Massachusetts.

Houghs Neck /ˈhaʊz/ is a one-square-mile (2.6 km^{2}) peninsula in Quincy, Massachusetts. It is surrounded by Quincy Bay, Hingham Bay and Rock Island Cove. It is lined by Perry Beach, which runs along Manet Avenue; Nut Island, which is just beyond Great Hill at the very end of the peninsula; and Edgewater Drive.

Houghs Neck is commonly referred to by locals as "The Neck" or "God's Country," and its residents as "Neckahs" ("Neckers") or "Neck Birds".

The Hough's Neck Pumping Station (or the "Pumpy" by the locals) is also part of the Boston Harbor Islands, along with Raccoon Island, which can be walked to at low tide. Raccoon Island covers 0.3 sq. miles.

In 1778, founding father John Adams left for a diplomatic mission to France from Houghs Neck instead of Boston, to evade capture by the British.

== History ==
Houghs Neck is named for Atherton Hough, previously mayor of Boston, England, who was granted the land in 1636 as a farm and orchard. The neighborhood's elementary school is also named for Atherton Hough. The peninsula has been called the "flounder capital of the world" and once had six boat rental businesses geared toward catching the bottom dwelling winter flounder that spent the cold weather months in Boston Harbor. Due to its proximity to Boston and its coastline, it was considered a summer resort from the late 19th century well into the 20th. Currently, Houghs Neck is a thickly settled neighborhood.

== Transportation ==
Sea Street and Manet Avenue are major thoroughfares in the neighborhood. The Massachusetts Bay Transportation Authority provides service to Houghs Neck with the 216 bus route, which links this area to the Red Line train station in Quincy Center.
