= Quincy Bay =

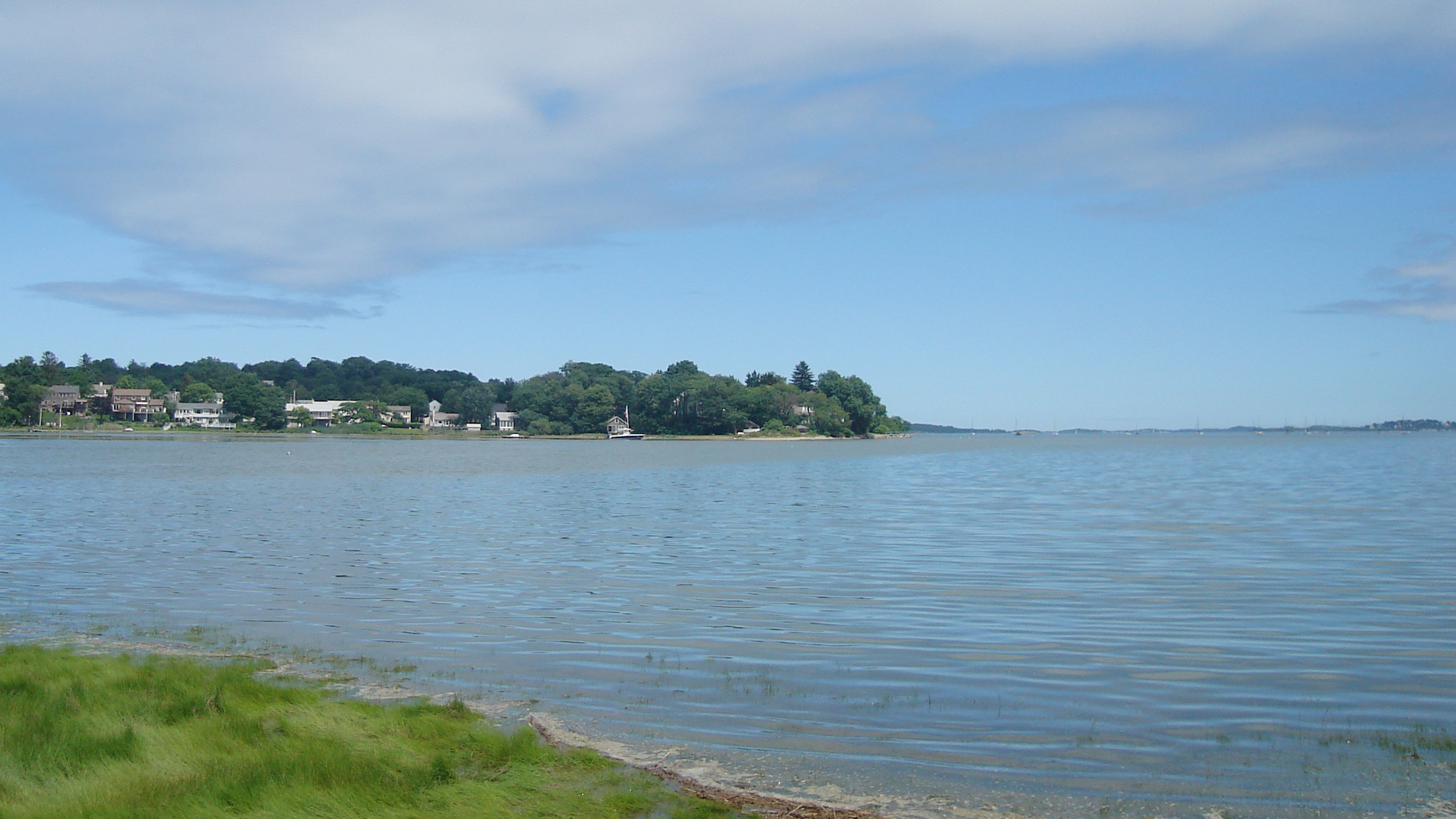
- View looking east across Quincy Bay with Squantum on the left

- Southern part of Boston Harbor showing Quincy Bay and nearby features
- Location: Massachusetts, United States
- Coordinates: 42.282°N 70.986°W
- Type: Bay

Quincy Bay is the largest of the three small bays of southern Boston Harbor, part of Massachusetts Bay and forming much of the shoreline of the city of Quincy, Massachusetts. Locally in the Wollaston neighborhood of Quincy it is known as Wollaston Bay. The bay is home to Moon Island, Long Island, and Hangman Island.

Quincy Bay extends from Squantum and Dorchester Bay in the northwest to Hough's Neck and Hingham Bay in the east. Its southwestern shore is Wollaston Beach. The Squantum Yacht Club and the Wollaston Yacht Club are on Quincy Bay along Wollaston Beach. Quincy Shore Drive, one of the Massachusetts Department of Conservation and Recreation parkways in the Greater Boston area, travels 2.1 miles (3.4 km) along Quincy Bay, offering panoramic views of the Boston Harbor Islands and the Boston skyline.
