= USS S-23 =

Submarine of the United States

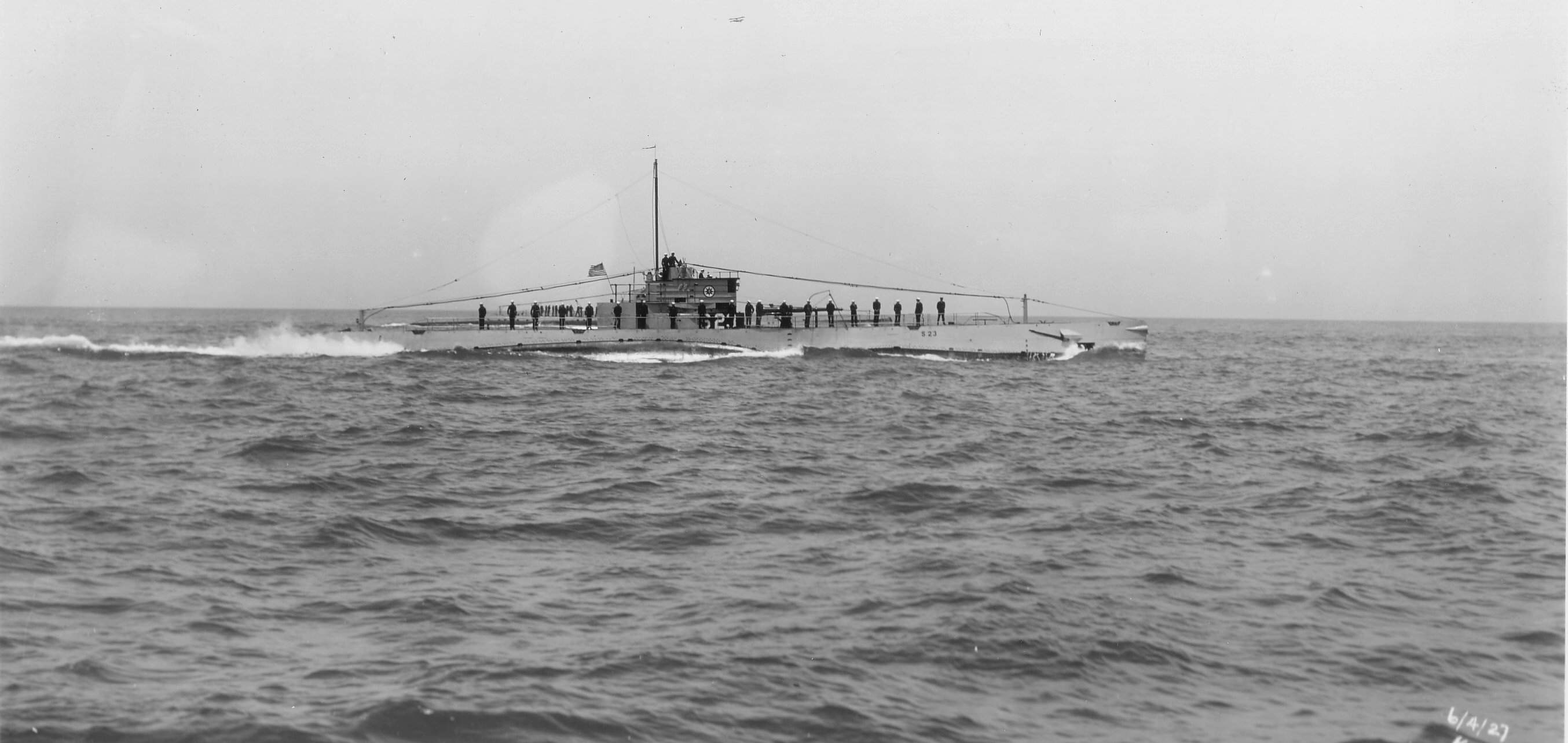
- USS S-23 (SS-128) with USS S-3 (SS-107) during the Presidential Review of 4 June 1927, on maneuvers in the Atlantic, with her crew lining the rails

History

United States
- Name: S-23
- Builder: Fore River Shipyard, Quincy, Massachusetts
- Cost: $677,622.77 (hull and machinery)
- Laid down: 18 January 1919
- Launched: 27 October 1920
- Sponsored by: Miss Barbara Sears
- Commissioned: 30 October 1923
- Decommissioned: 2 November 1945
- Stricken: 16 November 1945
- Identification: Hull symbol: SS-128; Call sign: NINM
- Fate: Sold for scrapping, 9 November 1946

General characteristics
- Class & type: S-18-class submarine
- Displacement: 930 long tons (945 t) surfaced; 1,094 long tons (1,112 t) submerged
- Length: 219 feet 3 inches (66.83 m)
- Beam: 20 ft 8 in (6.30 m)
- Draft: 17 ft 3 in (5.26 m)
- Installed power: 1,200 brake horsepower (895 kW) diesel; 2,375 hp (1,771 kW) electric
- Propulsion: 2 × NELSECO diesel engines; 2 × Ridgway Dynamo & Engine Company electric motors; 2 × 60-cell batteries; 2 × Propellers
- Speed: 14.5 knots (26.9 km/h; 16.7 mph) surfaced; 11 kn (20 km/h; 13 mph) submerged
- Range: 3,420 nmi (6,330 km; 3,940 mi) at 6.5 kn (12.0 km/h; 7.5 mph) surfaced; 8,950 nmi (16,580 km; 10,300 mi) at 9.5 kn (17.6 km/h; 10.9 mph) surfaced with fuel in main ballast tanks; 20 hours at 5 knots (9 km/h; 6 mph) submerged
- Test depth: 200 ft (61 m)
- Capacity: 41,921 US gallons (158,690 L; 34,907 imp gal) fuel oil
- Complement: 4 officers; 34 enlisted
- Armament: 4 × 21-inch (533 mm) torpedo tubes (12 torpedoes); 1 × 4-inch (102 mm)/50-caliber

Service record
- Operations: World War II; Pacific campaign; Aleutian Islands campaign
- Awards: American Defense Service Medal with "FLEET" clasp; American Campaign Medal; Asiatic-Pacific Campaign Medal with one battle star; World War II Victory Medal; One battle star

USS S-23 (SS-128) was an S-18-class submarine, also referred to as an S-1-class or "Holland"-type, of the United States Navy, in commission from 1923 to 1945. She served during World War II, seeing duty primarily in the Aleutian Islands campaign, until 1943, when she transferred to San Diego, to provide training there.

== Design ==
The S-18-class had a length of 219 feet 3 inches (66.8 m) overall, a beam of 20 ft 8 in (6.3 m), and a mean draft of 17 ft 3 in (5.3 m). They displaced 930 long tons (940 t) on the surface and 1,094 long tons (1,112 t) submerged. All S-class submarines had a crew of 4 officers and 34 enlisted men, when first commissioned. They had a diving depth of 200 ft (61.0 m).

For surface running, the S-18-class were powered by two 600-brake-horsepower (447 kW) NELSECO diesel engines, each driving one propeller shaft. When submerged each propeller was driven by a 1,175-horsepower (876 kW) Ridgway Dynamo & Engine Company electric motor. They could reach 14 knots (26 km/h; 16 mph) on the surface and 11 kn (20 km/h; 13 mph) underwater.

The boats were armed with four 21-inch (533 mm) torpedo tubes in the bow. They carried eight reloads, for a total of twelve torpedoes. The S-18-class submarines were also armed with a single 4 in (100 mm)/50 caliber deck gun.

== Construction ==
S-23's keel was laid down on 18 January 1919, by the Bethlehem Shipbuilding Corporation's Fore River Shipyard, in Quincy, Massachusetts. She was launched on 27 October 1920, sponsored by Miss Barbara Sears, the daughter of Russell Adams Sears, the former mayor of Quincy, and commissioned on 30 October 1923.

== Service history ==
=== 1923–1941 ===
Initially assigned to Submarine Division 11, Control Force, S-23 was based at New London, Connecticut, until 1931. During that time, she operated off the New England coast, from late spring until early winter, then moved south for winter and spring exercises. From 1925 on, her annual deployments included participation in Fleet Problems, and those maneuvers occasionally took her from the Caribbean Sea into the Pacific Ocean.

In 1931, S-23 was transferred to the Pacific Fleet, and on 5 January 1931, she departed New London, for the Panama Canal, California, and the Territory of Hawaii. Enroute, she participated in Fleet Problem XII. On 25 April 1931, she arrived at her new home port, Pearl Harbor, Hawaii, whence she operated, with Submarine Division 7 for the next ten years.

In June 1941, Division 7 became Division 41, and on 1 September 1941, S-23 departed the Pearl Harbor for California. An overhaul and operations off the West Coast took her into December 1941, when the United States entered World War II, with the Japanese attack on Pearl Harbor, on 7 December.

=== World War II ===
After the Pearl Harbor attack, S-23's crew prepared for service in the Aleutian Islands. Radiant-type heaters were purchased in San Diego, California, to augment the heat provided by the galley range. Heavier and more waterproof clothing, including ski masks, were added to the regular issue provided to submarine crews. The submarine itself was fitted out for wartime service and, in January 1942, S-23 moved north to Dutch Harbor, on Amaknak Island, off Unalaska, in the Aleutian Islands.

==== First war patrol ====
On the afternoon of 7 February 1942, S-23 departed Dutch Harbor, on her first war patrol. Within hours, she encountered the heavy seas and poor visibility which characterized the Aleutians. Waves broke over the bridge, battering those on duty there, and sent water cascading down the conning tower hatch. On 10 February 1942, S-23 stopped to jettison torn sections of the superstructure, a procedure she was to repeat on her subsequent patrols. On 13 February 1942, the heavy seas caused broken bones to some men on the bridge. For another three days, the submarine patrolled the great circle route from Japan, then headed home, arriving at Dutch Harbor, on 17 February 1942.

==== February–June 1942 ====
From Dutch Harbor, S-23 was ordered back to San Diego, for overhaul and brief sound school duty. On her arrival at San Diego, her crew requested improved electrical, heating, and communications gear, and the installation of a fathometer, radar, and keel-mounted sonar. The latter requests were to be repeated after each of her next three patrols, but became available only after her fourth patrol.

==== Second war patrol ====
On 20 May, S-23 again departed for the Aleutians. Proceeding via Port Angeles, Washington, she arrived back in Alaskan waters, on 29 May 1942, and was directed to patrol to the west of Unalaska, to guard against an anticipated Japanese attack. On 2 June 1942, however, 20-foot (6.1 m) waves broke over the bridge and seriously injured two men. She headed for Dutch Harbor, to transfer the men for medical treatment. Arriving the same day, she was still in the harbor the following morning, 3 June 1942, when planes from the Japanese Navy aircraft carriers Ryujo and Jun'yo attacked Dutch Harbor.

After the first raid, S-23 cleared the harbor and within hours arrived in her assigned patrol area, where she remained until 11 June 1942. She was then ordered back to Dutch Harbor, replenished and was sent to patrol southeast of Attu, which the Japanese had occupied, along with Kiska, a few days earlier.

For the next 19 days, she hunted for Japanese logistic and warships enroute to Attu, and reconnoitered Attu's bays and harbors. She made several attempts to close targets, but fog, her slow speed, and her poor maneuverability, precluded attacks in all but one case: On 17 June 1942, she fired on a tanker, but did not score. On 2 July 1942, she headed back to Unalaska, and arrived at Dutch Harbor, early on the morning of 4 July 1942.

==== Third war patrol ====
During her third war patrol, conducted from 15 July to 18 August 1942, S-23 again patrolled primarily in the Attu area. On 6 August 1942, she was diverted closer to Kiska, to support a US Navy bombardment of the island. On 9 August 1942, she returned to her patrol area, where her previous experiences in closing enemy targets were repeated.

==== Fourth war patrol ====
Eight days after her return to Dutch Harbor, S-23 again headed west, and on 28 August 1942, she arrived in her assigned area to serve as a protective scout during the US occupation of Adak. During most of her time on station, the weather was overcast, but it proved to be the most favorable she had experienced in eight months of Alaskan operations. On 16 September 1942, she was recalled from patrol to meet her 20 September scheduled date of departure for San Diego, for upkeep and sound school duty.

==== Fifth war patrol ====
On 7 December 1942, S-23 returned to Unalaska, and on 17 December, she got underway on her fifth war patrol. By 22 December, she was off western Attu, and on 23 December, she received orders to take up station off Paramushiro, at the northern end of the Kuril Islands. On 24 December, she headed for the Kuril Islands. On 26 December, 200 nautical miles (370 km; 230 mi) from her destination, her stern diving plane operating gear outside the hull broke. Since submerging and depth control became difficult, she turned back for Dutch Harbor. Moving east, her mechanical difficulties increased; her stern planes damaged her propellers; her fouled rudder resulted in a damaged gear train. Nature added severe snow and ice storms, after 3 January 1943, but on 6 January 1943, S-23 made it into Dutch Harbor.

==== Sixth war patrol ====
Using equipment and parts from her sister ship, S-35, S-23 was repaired at Dutch Harbor, and at Kodiak, and on 28 January 1943, she departed her Unalaska base, for another patrol in the Attu area. She spent 21 days on station, two of which, 6 and 7 February 1943, were spent repairing the port main motor control panel. She scored on no enemy ships and returned to Dutch Harbor on 26 February.

==== Seventh war patrol ====
Refit, the submarine got underway for her last war patrol, on 8 March 1943. Moving west, she arrived off the Kamchatka Peninsula, on 14 March 1943, and encountered floes with ice 2 1/2 to 3 ft (0.76 to 0.91 m) thick. Her progress down the coast, in search of the Japanese fishing fleet, slowed, and initially limited to moving during daylight hours, she rounded Cape Kronotsky, on the afternoon of 16 March 1943, and Cape Lopatka, on the morning of 19 March 1943. She then set a course back to the Aleutians, which would take her across Japanese supply lanes, between the Kuril and Aleutian Islands. On 26 March 1943, she took up patrol duty in the Attu area, and on 31 March 1943 departed her patrol area for her homeward voyage to Dutch Harbor.

==== April 1943–September 1945 ====
In April 1943, S-23 returned to San Diego. During the summer of 1943, she underwent an extensive overhaul. In the fall of 1943, she began providing training services to the sound school, which she continued through the end of World War II in August 1945.

== Fate ==
On 11 September 1945, S-23 departed San Diego, bound for San Francisco, where she was decommissioned, on 2 November 1945. On 16 November 1945, her name was struck from the Naval Vessel Register. Her hulk subsequently was sold for scrapping and was delivered to the purchaser, the Salco Iron and Metal Company, of San Francisco, on 15 November 1946.

== Awards ==
S-23 was awarded one battle star for her World War II service.

- American Defense Service Medal with "FLEET" clasp
- American Campaign Medal
- Asiatic-Pacific Campaign Medal with one battle star
- World War II Victory Medal

== Bibliography ==
- "Table 21 - Ships on Navy List June 30, 1919". Congressional Serial Set. U.S. Government Printing Office: 770. 1921.
- Friedman, Norman (1995). U.S. Submarines Through 1945: An Illustrated Design History. Annapolis, Maryland: Naval Institute Press. ISBN 1-55750-263-3.
- Priolo, Gary. "S-23 (SS-128)". Navsource.net.
- "S-23". Dictionary of American Naval Fighting Ships. Navy Department, Naval History and Heritage Command. 1 September 2015. This article incorporates text from this source, which is in the public domain.
- Hall, Anne Martin (1925). Ships of the United States navy and their sponsors, 1913-1923.
