= Arthur Tobin =

American politician (1930–2026)

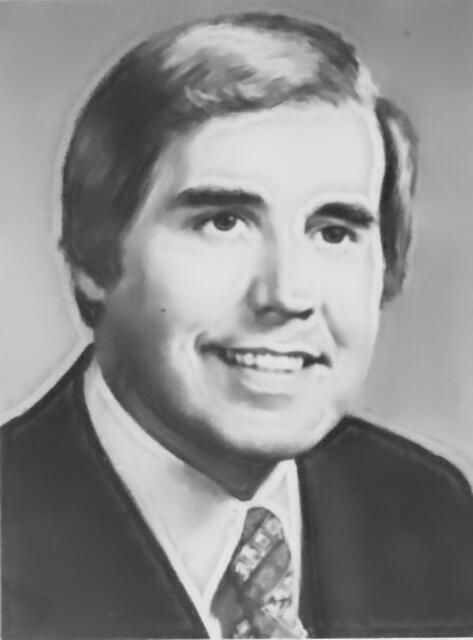

Clerk Magistrate of the Quincy District Court
- In office 1982–2026
- Preceded by: Dennis F. Ryan

Mayor of Quincy, Massachusetts
- In office 1978–1981
- Preceded by: Joseph LaRala
- Succeeded by: Francis X. McCauley

Member of the Massachusetts Senate from the Norfolk district
- In office 1971–1978
- Preceded by: James McIntyre
- Succeeded by: Paul D. Harold

Member of the Massachusetts House of Representatives
- In office January 4, 1967 – 1971
- Preceded by: Charles L. Shea
- Succeeded by: Thomas F. Brownell
- Constituency: 2nd Norfolk district (1967-1969); 1st Norfolk district (1969-1971)

Member of the Quincy City Council
- In office 1968 – 1977; President: 1970-1976

Personal details
- Born: Arthur Henry Tobin; May 22, 1930 Quincy, Massachusetts
- Died: January 16, 2026 (aged 95)
- Party: Democratic
- Education: Boston College (BA); Suffolk University (JD)
- Occupation: Lawyer; Politician

Military service
- Branch/service: United States Marine Corps
- Battles/wars: Korean War

Arthur Henry Tobin (May 22, 1930 – January 16, 2026) was an American lawyer and politician from Quincy, Massachusetts. He served on the Quincy City Council and in the Massachusetts legislature before being elected the 29th mayor of Quincy. After serving as mayor, he was appointed clerk magistrate of the Quincy District Court.

== Early life ==
Tobin was born on May 22, 1930, at Quincy City Hospital. He shared the same hospital room as future political ally James McIntyre, who was born on May 25. Tobin attended Quincy Public Schools, graduating from Quincy High School in 1948 and later graduated from Boston College. After graduation he enlisted in the United States Marine Corps and served during the Korean War. After his military service he graduated from Suffolk Law School and became a lawyer.

== Political career ==
In 1966, Tobin was appointed to the Quincy board of assessors. The following year he was elected to the city council. He remained on the council until 1977 and was the council president from 1970 to 1976. From 1967 to 1971 he was a member of the Massachusetts House of Representatives. He was elected to the Massachusetts Senate in 1971 in a special election to succeed James McIntyre. From 1978 to 1981, Tobin was mayor of Quincy. During his tenure as Mayor, Tobin managed the city during the Blizzard of 1978 and oversaw the construction of the Stop & Shop headquarters in Quincy Center and the National Fire Protection Association headquarters in West Quincy. In 1982, Governor Edward J. King appointed Tobin to the position of clerk magistrate of the Quincy District Court.

== Personal life ==
Tobin is the father of former state representative A. Stephen Tobin and the father-in-law of former Quincy mayor William J. Phelan.

In 2009, Tobin hit a school bus with his car and left the scene stating he did not realize he had hit it. Police did not charge him with hit and run because he did not know he had hit the bus.

Tobin died on January 16, 2026, one day after his wife, Shirley, died. Tobin's death also came one day after the death of James A. Sheets, who served as the 31st mayor of Quincy.
