= Amelio Della Chiesa =

American politician (1901-1975)

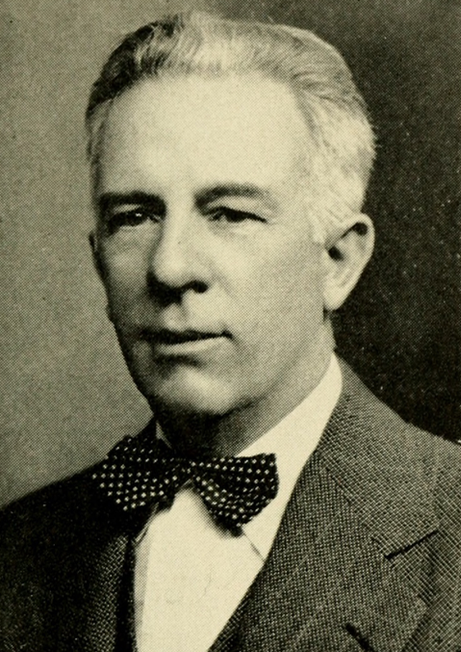
- Portrait of member of the Massachusetts House of Representatives, Amelio Della Chiesa

Mayor of Quincy, Massachusetts
- In office 1954–1965
- Preceded by: David S. McIntosh
- Succeeded by: James McIntyre

Member of the Massachusetts House of Representatives from the 1st Norfolk district
- In office 1953–1969
- Preceded by: Alfred B. Keith
- Succeeded by: Arthur Tobin

Personal details
- Born: July 31, 1901 Quincy, Massachusetts
- Died: October 1, 1975 (aged 74) Boston, Massachusetts
- Party: Republican
- Occupation: Plumber

Amelio A. Della Chiesa (1901-1975) was an American politician who served as mayor of Quincy, Massachusetts.

== Early life ==
Della Chiesa was born on July 31, 1901, in Quincy, Massachusetts. He attended public schools in Quincy, Massachusetts, including the Quincy Trade School, but dropped out in eighth grade. At the age of sixteen he became a journeyman plumber at 17 he became the youngest master plumber in Massachusetts.

== Political career ==
Della Chiesa began his political career in 1943 when he succeeded his brother, Aldo (who had entered the military), on the Quincy City Council. From 1954 to 1957, Della Chiesa served as Quincy's mayor under the Plan E form of government, in which the position of Mayor was a ceremonial one appointed by the city council while the government was run by a city manager. When the city switched to a Plan A form of government, he was elected to position, which he held until his retirement in 1965. During his tenure as mayor, Quincy Vocational Technical School was constructed and additions were built at Quincy City Hospital, North Quincy Branch Library, and the Atlantic Fire Station.

From 1953 to 1969, Della Chiesa also served as a member of the Massachusetts House of Representatives from the 1st Norfolk district. He served as assistant minority floor leader and monitor of the House.

From 1964 to 1965, Della Chiesa was the vice chairman of the Massachusetts Bay Transportation Authority advisory board.

In retirement, he and his wife moved to Pembroke, Massachusetts.

== Death ==
Della Chiesa died on October 1, 1975, following a long illness.

== See also ==
- 1953–1954 Massachusetts legislature
- 1955–1956 Massachusetts legislature
