= Thomas S. Burgin =

American politician (1902–1986)

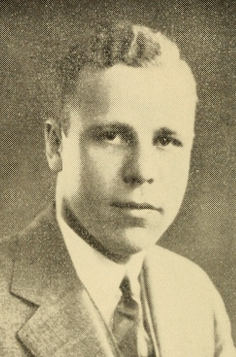

Member of the Massachusetts Senate for the 1st Norfolk district
- In office 1961–1962
- Preceded by: Charles Hedges
- Succeeded by: James S. McCormack

Mayor of Quincy, Massachusetts
- In office 1950–1951
- Preceded by: Charles A. Ross
- Succeeded by: David S. McIntosh
- In office 1935–1942
- Preceded by: Leo E. Mullin
- Succeeded by: William W. Jenness

Member of the Massachusetts House of Representatives for the 3rd Norfolk district
- In office 1929–1930
- Preceded by: Joseph B. Grossman
- Succeeded by: Joseph B. Grossman

Personal details
- Born: April 15, 1902 Quincy, Massachusetts, U.S.
- Died: January 24, 1986 (aged 83) Quincy, Massachusetts, U.S.
- Resting place: Mount Wollaston Cemetery; Quincy, Massachusetts
- Party: Republican

Thomas Skudder Burgin (April 15, 1902 – January 24, 1986) was an American politician who was mayor of Quincy, Massachusetts (1938–1942 and 1950–1951) and a member of the Massachusetts House of Representatives (1929–1930) and the Massachusetts Senate (1960–1961).

== Early life ==
Burgin was born in Quincy on April 15, 1902. He graduated from Milton Academy in 1922 and began his career as a clerk at the Quincy Savings Bank. He served as a trustee of the bank from 1926 to 1977 and was a member of its board of investment from 1947 to 1977. He operated an insurance agency from 1925 to 1968.

== Politics ==
Burgin was first elected to the Quincy city council in 1924. He was council president from 1927 to 1929. From 1929 to 1930, he represented the 3rd Norfolk district in the Massachusetts House of Representatives. He was elected to the city council again in 1931 and served as council president in 1932.

In 1935, Burgin was a candidate for mayor after Charles A. Ross was removed from office by three justices of the Massachusetts Superior Court. He defeated acting mayor Leo E. Mullin by 4,915 votes. He was inaugurated on June 14, 1935. He was elected to a full term in 1936, defeating former mayor Thomas J. McGrath 15,692 votes to 4,824. He defeated Ross by less than 6,000 votes in 1938 and was unopposed in 1940. Burgin led the city's recovery following the 1938 New England hurricane and prepared the city for the United States' entrance into World War II. He was not a candidate for reelection in 1942 and resigned on November 20, 1942 to enter the United States Navy.

Burgin returned to the Quincy city council in 1950. He was appointed mayor under the new Plan E form of government, which was now a ceremonial position. He stepped down as mayor in 1951, but remained a member of the council until 1959.

Burgin was elected to the Massachusetts Senate in 1960. He represented the 1st Norfolk district, which consisted of Quincy, Braintree, and Randolph. He was defeated for reelection by Democrat James S. McCormack. It was the only time Burgin lost an election.

== Later life ==
The Burgin Parkway, a thoroughfare that connected downtown Quincy to Routes 3 and 128 was named in Burgin's honor. It opened in November 1985, but Burgin was unable to attend the ceremonies due to illness. He died on January 24, 1986 in Quincy. He was buried in Mount Wollaston Cemetery.
