= Joseph L. Whiton =

American politician (1873–1966)

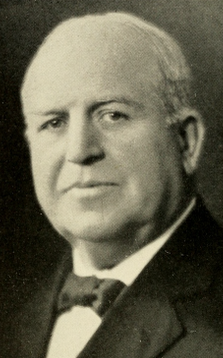

Member of the Massachusetts House of Representatives
- In office 1937–1944
- Preceded by: John R. Shaughnessy
- Succeeded by: John L. Gallant
- Constituency: 3rd Norfolk district (1937–1940); 2nd Norfolk district (1941–1944)

Member of the Massachusetts House of Representatives for the 2nd Norfolk district
- In office 1933–1935
- Preceded by: Joseph B. Grossman
- Succeeded by: John R. Shaughnessy

Mayor of Quincy, Massachusetts
- In office 1917–1920
- Preceded by: Gustave B. Bates
- Succeeded by: William A. Bradford
- In office 1914; Acting
- Preceded by: John Miller
- Succeeded by: Chester I. Campbell

Personal details
- Born: February 28, 1873 Quincy, Massachusetts, U.S.
- Died: April 5, 1966 (aged 93) Quincy, Massachusetts, U.S.
- Resting place: Mount Wollaston Cemetery; Quincy, Massachusetts
- Party: Republican (prior to 1912); Bull Moose Party (1912–1914); Republican (after 1914)

Joseph Lincoln Whiton Jr. (February 28, 1873 – April 5, 1966) was an American politician who was mayor of Quincy, Massachusetts (1914, 1917–1920) and a member of the Massachusetts House of Representatives (1933–1934, 1937–1944).

== Early life ==
Whiton was born in Quincy on February 28, 1873. He was educated in the Quincy Public Schools.

== Career ==
Whiton began his political career as a member of the Quincy city council. He was elected as a Republican, but supported Democratic mayor William T. Shea. In 1912, he was elected to the council on the Progressive ticket. In 1913, he was elected council president. He became acting mayor following the death of John Miller in 1914.

In 1916, Whiton defeated incumbent mayor Gustave B. Bates by 169 votes. He served from 1917 to 1920, leading the city during World War I. He was an unsuccessful mayoral candidate in 1926.

Whiton returned to the Quincy city council in 1932. He represented the 3rd Norfolk district in the Massachusetts House of Representatives from 1933 to 1934. He was defeated for reelection by John R. Shaughnessy. He returned to the House in 1937 and served until 1944.

== Death ==
Whiton died on April 5, 1966 in Quincy.
