= Senator McIntyre (disambiguation) =

Thomas J. McIntyre (1915–1992), U.S. Senator from New Hampshire from 1962 to 1979. Senator McIntyre may also refer to:

- Archibald McIntyre (1772–1858), American merchant and politician
- James McIntyre (politician) (1930–1984), Massachusetts
- Judy Eason McIntyre (born 1945), Oklahoma
