= Joseph B. Grossman =

American politician

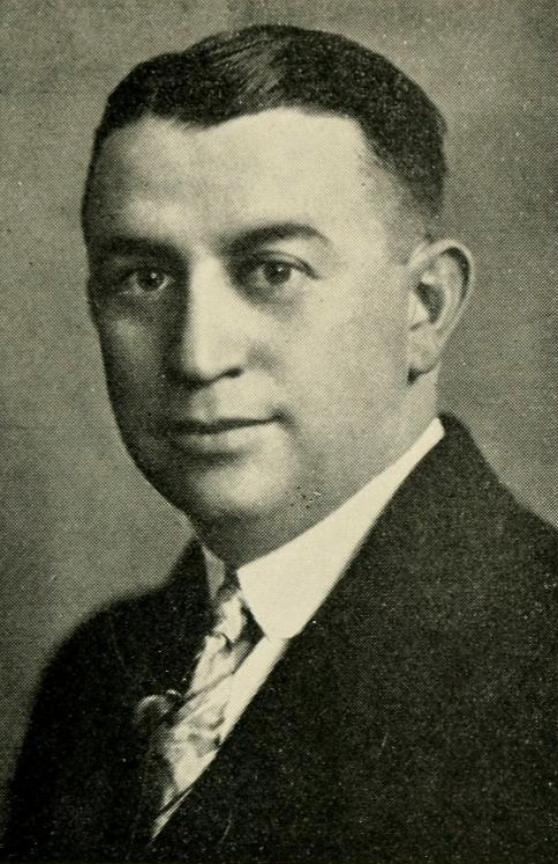

Member of the Massachusetts Governor's Council from the 2nd district
- In office 1933–1939
- Preceded by: Chester I. Campbell
- Succeeded by: Clayton L. Havey

Member of the Massachusetts House of Representatives from the 3rd Norfolk district
- In office 1931–1933
- Preceded by: Thomas S. Burgin
- Succeeded by: Joseph L. Whiton
- In office 1927–1929
- Succeeded by: Thomas S. Burgin

Personal details
- Born: July 15, 1892 Quincy, Massachusetts
- Died: November 7, 1990 (aged 98) Roslindale
- Party: Republican
- Spouse(s): Esther Loitman (1914–1962; her death); Esther Starr (1963–1990; his death)
- Education: Plymouth Business College

Joseph B. "J. B." Grossman was an American businessman, politician, and philanthropist who served as a member of the Massachusetts House of Representatives and the Massachusetts Governor's Council and was treasurer of Grossman's, a building materials company. He was the first Jewish member of the Governor's Council.

== Early life ==
Grossman was born on July 15, 1892, in Quincy, Massachusetts. His first job was working as a clerk for a Quincy granite company. He also worked as a reporter for The Patriot Ledger. He attended the Plymouth Business School.

== Political career ==
In 1914, Grossman was appointed to the Quincy Board of Registrars. At the age of 21, he was the youngest member of an election board in Massachusetts. He remained on the board for nine years.

Grossman represented the 3rd Norfolk District in the Massachusetts House of Representatives from 1927 to 1929 and again from 1931 to 1933. In 1932 he was elected to an open seat on the Massachusetts Governor's Council. He was the first Jew elected to the body. During his tenure on the council, Grossman was a staunch opponent of Governor James Michael Curley. In 1938, Grossman announced that he was ending his reelection campaign to focus on his business. However, he left open the possibility of running "for a state-wide office" in the future. In 1962, Grossman ran for Massachusetts state treasurer. He defeated Francis Andrew Walsh in the Republican primary 71% to 29%, but lost in the general election to Democrat John T. Driscoll, 62% to 37%.

== Business career ==
In 1914, Grossman joined his family's building materials company. He spent most of his career with Grossman's as the company treasurer. In 1962, he moved to the position of vice chairman and senior financial advisor. In 1969, the Grossmans sold the business to Evans Products Co. By the time of the sale, Grossman's had become the largest lumber and building materials retailer in New England and had also become involved in the redevelopment of vacant mill buildings.

In 1933, Grossman founded Home Owners Federal Savings and Loan Association of Boston. He served as the institution's president until his retirement in 1979.

Grossman also served a director of the Quincy Cooperative Bank and Boston World Trade Center. During his 39 years with the Quincy Cooperative Bank, its assets grew from $130,000 to $50 million.

== Philanthropy ==
Grossman was a benefactor of Beth Israel Hospital, Quincy City Hospital, Jewish Memorial Hospital, New England Sinai Hospital, Brandeis University, and the Combined Jewish Philanthropies. He also founded two camps for underprivileged children, established scholarships at Brandeis, Harvard, and the Quincy City Hospital School of Nursing, and served as president of the Quincy Community Chest (now the United Way of Quincy) and the American Red Cross in Quincy.

== Personal life ==
In 1914, Grossman married Esther Loitman. The couple had two sons and one daughter. Esther L. Grossman died on April 30, 1962, following a brief illness. In December 1963, Grossman married Esther Starr, a teacher at Medford High School, at Temple Sinai in her hometown of Brookline, Massachusetts.

Grossman died on November 7, 1990, at the age of 98. He was survived by his second wife and three children.

== See also ==
- 1927–1928 Massachusetts legislature
- 1931–1932 Massachusetts legislature

Party political offices
Preceded by Walter J. Trybulski	Republican nominee for Treasurer and Receiver-General of Massachusetts; 1962	Succeeded by Robert C. Hahn
