= North Quincy High School =

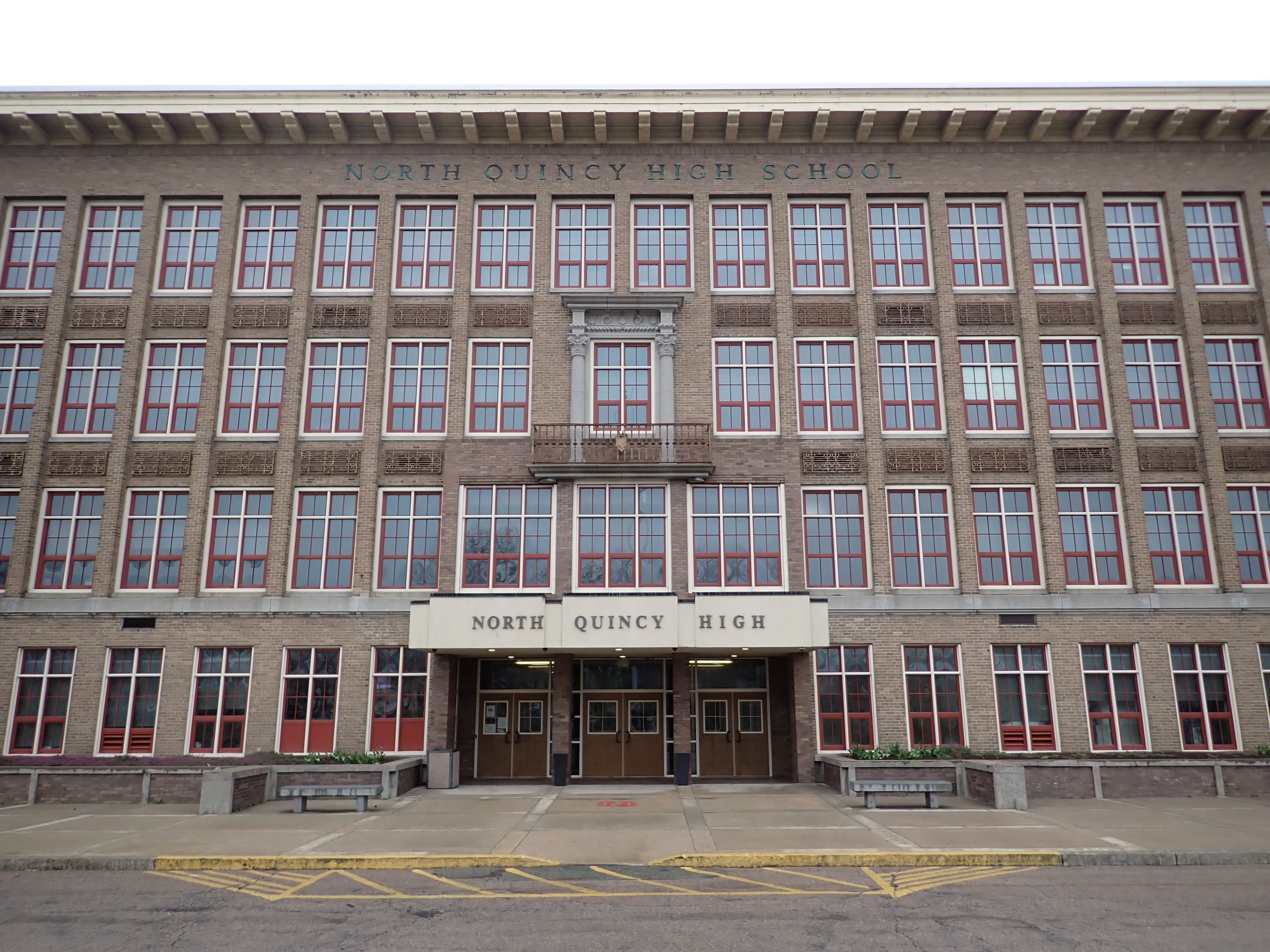

Location
- 316 Hancock Street; Quincy, MA; United States; 42.277142°N 71.028371°W

Information
- Type: Public
- Motto: A Symbol of Pride and Excellence
- Established: 1926
- School district: Quincy Public Schools
- Teaching staff: 99.06 (FTE)
- Grades: 9-12
- Enrollment: 1,508 (2023–2024)
- Student to teacher ratio: 15.22
- Campus: Urban
- Colors: Red & Black
- Mascot: Pilgrim
- Nickname: Raiders
- Rival: Quincy High School
- Accreditation: NEASC
- Yearbook: Manet
- Website: North Quincy High School

North Quincy High School (NQHS) is a public secondary school located in the North Quincy neighborhood of Quincy, Massachusetts, United States. The school serves grades 9 through 12 and has an enrollment of over 1,200 students. It is one of two public high schools in the city—the other being Quincy High School. The school's mascot is known as "Yakoo", and its school colors are red and black.

== History ==
The school was originally built as North Junior High School in 1925. An additional wing was added to the eastern side of the building in 1931, and the school was changed into a senior high school. The newly established North Quincy High School graduated its first class of seniors in 1934, and a second wing was added to the building two years later. Both the original structure and the two subsequent additions were designed by Frank Irving Cooper.

In the 1970s, the school underwent major renovations, adding a new gymnasium and cafeteria. A large new wing in the Brutalist style was added to the rear of the building, designed by the Colletti Brothers of Hingham, built atop Oliver Street, which was controversially razed for the construction; the old glass "gondola" in the rear of the old building which served as the principal's office in the 1950s and 1960s was also removed. Finally, the entrance to the school was changed, removing stairs leading into a second-floor vestibule as well as two flanking concrete statues of lions.

The school is once again slated to undergo exterior renovations, beginning with the purchase and razing of much of Hunt Street, and nine houses occupying the section, which will be replaced with parking and access to nearby Teal Field, as well as the fencing in of the entire campus, in conjunction with ongoing modifications of Hancock and West Squantum Streets for easing of traffic constrictions.

The school's atrium was rededicated as the Atrium of Honor in April 2011. The Atrium honors North Quincy High School students and graduates who have served in the U.S. military. This includes two Medal of Honor recipients, Everett Pope and William Caddy. Wall panels are dedicated to Pope, Caddy, E. Alan Brudno, Richard A. Stratton, and Charles Sweeney.

The school has had nine principals in its history. The first, James S. Collins, served as principal from the school's opening in the 1920s and retired in 1956. John Walsh was a Spanish teacher, assistant principal, and then the school's second principal from 1956 to 1972. Peter J. Chrisom, a graduate of the school, was principal from 1972 to 1998. The school's auditorium is named for him. He was succeeded by his long-time assistant principal, Eileen Feeney, who served as the school's fourth principal from 1998 to 1999. The fifth principal was Louis P. Ioanilli, who served from 1999 until his retirement in 2007. He was followed by Earl Metzler, principal from 2007 to 2012. Metzler left to become a superintendent of schools in a New Hampshire district. The seventh principal was Robert Shaw, from 2012 to 2021. In 2021, Keith Ford was appointed as the eighth principal of the school; the following year, he moved to Quincy High School and was followed by former Broad Meadows Middle School principal Daniel Gilbert.

== Demographics ==
From the 1990s to 2011 the number of Asian students increased by 40%. According to former student Tony Liang, quoted in The Patriot Ledger, the Asian students in the 1990s were mostly born in China, but by 2011 most of the Asian students were American-born. As of 2021, 53.5% of students were Asian and 34.2% were white.

== Athletics ==
"North" competed for many years in the high school Atlantic Coast and Old Colony Leagues, which comprised teams from the South Shore. In recent years, the school has competed in the Patriot League, and its athletic teams are known as the Raiders.

== Clubs and teams ==
North Quincy High has a range of teams and clubs.

=== Academic teams ===
North Quincy High has many academic teams, including the Debate Team, Academic Decathlon, Math Team, History Bowl, and Science Olympiad.

MOON (Mathematical Organization of North Quincy) has competed in the Greater Boston Math League.

The Debate team participates in regional debates hosted at venues such as Harvard University and Boston University, as well as many other events throughout the Northeast.

The Model United Nations club participates in academic discussions and intellectual forums throughout the Boston area.

The History club discusses both historical and modern-day events, engages in trips to historical venues, and attends forums at local area universities.

The Quiz Bowl team participates in various tournaments, notably winning WGBH’s High School Quiz Show in 2013 and 2022.

=== Air Force JROTC ===
The MA 841st AFJROTC Unit has competed at many local and regional drill competitions, placing very frequently. As of 2013, persons of Asian origin make up 92% of the cadets in the North Quincy High JROTC program.

=== Arts ===
The Art Club allows students to explore and develop various skills, such as sculpting, drawing, and painting. The artwork is often displayed in local locations, such as the Thomas Crane Library and at school art shows.

The NQHS Band is, today, part of the combined Quincy/North Quincy Band, the two schools no longer perform separately. The QNQ Band participates in MICCA and NESBA Marching Band festivals and MICCA Concert Band festivals. The concert band is split into two bands, the QNQ Symphonic Band and the QNQ Wind Ensemble. The Wind Ensemble is audition-only and performs at separate events. The QNQ Band also participates in local parades and school concerts. The Band no longer participates in the Music in the Parks event at Six Flags amusement park due to budgetary limitations. It is also featured in the movie Here Comes the Boom, featuring Kevin James.

The NQHS Choir consists of all the choir students in the school. They perform in at least two shows a year. There is also the Select Choir, which is a more selective group of singers that perform at various competitions, including the Great East Festival. Many members have advanced to higher levels, including Regional and State competitions. The NQHS Choir participates in the Music in the Parks event at Six Flags once every two years.

The Drama Club provides students the opportunity to experience acting and tech crew experience. The Drama Club has put on many plays, including Flowers for Algernon, Leading Ladies, and Brighton Beach Memoirs. They also produce a musical every year, past performances include: The Music Man, Beauty and the Beast, All Shook Up, Into the Woods, The Sound Of Music, and Godspell.

=== Community service ===
There are many opportunities at North Quincy High to serve the local community and the surrounding area.

A chapter of Key Club International, the world's largest student-led service organization, organizes numerous service projects in the school and around the community. They are sponsored by the local Kiwanis Club.

The Interact Club, helped by the local Rotary Club, volunteers in many ways, ranging from serving pancake breakfasts in Retirement Homes to participating in the former Quincy Medical Center's Walk for Cancer.

The National Honor Society raises funds to donate to organizations that aid others in need, and volunteers at various local organizations, such as EvenTide Nursing Home and Cradles to Crayons.

S.A.D.D. speaks out for making healthy decisions in high school. It has brought many speakers and organizations to the school for students to gain wisdom from, including Rachael's Challenge, which has promoted an atmosphere of kindness and compassion to fellow students.

The Student Government runs events within the school and provides a structure for school-wide student events, ranging from Junior and Senior Prom to Fall and Spring Rallies. It also participates in helping the local community, such as penny drives and tab collection for the Shriners.

The Thomas Jefferson Forum is another opportunity for students to participate in the community and aiding others. They often help with organizations, such as the Jimmy Fund, South Shore Community Health Center, Wang Center, and the Greater Boston Food Bank.

In 2013, Quincy Public Schools launched a pilot program for 11th and 12th graders to participate in a graduation requirement of 20 hours of community service, to be completed before graduation. In June 2014, they announced that Community Service is now a graduation requirement for all Quincy and North Quincy High School students. As of 2014, freshmen must complete 40 hours of community service by graduation; sophomores, 30 hours; juniors, 20; and seniors, 10 hours.

=== FIRST Robotics Team (citywide robotics team) ===
The FIRST Robotics Competition Team, Team HYPER 69, has placed every year in the quarterfinals. They have won many regionals, including UTC New England Regional, Southern California Regional, and the Boston Regional. The team has also won many awards, including Rookie All-Star, Rockwell Automation Innovation in Control, General Motors Industrial Design Award, and the Creative Award by Xerox.

=== Literary publications and discussions ===
The school has a literary magazine, which has four publications a year, giving general updates about the school year and celebrating the achievements of the school and its students. The Manet yearbook is prepared and published every year.

There is also a book club where members can discuss assigned books, various plot points, author techniques, and enjoy the overall discussion and dissection of great literature.

== Mascot controversy ==
Mr. Yakoo, the school mascot, is a caricature of Armenian American dentist and NQHS benefactor Alan Yacubian. The mascot was the subject of controversy for its longstanding use of Indian warrior dress. Yakoo sported a Mohawk hairstyle, a feathered headband, and a tomahawk and spear. In older versions, he is depicted with bright red skin. Yakoo was created by student Peter Fredericksen on November 29, 1957, when Yacubian was also a student. Several complaints were lodged over the years to change the mascot. In 1991, the Quincy School Committee overrode Superintendent Robert Ricci's decision to remove the mascot. The school was investigated in the 1990s by civil rights officials from the U.S. Department of Education, the Massachusetts Commission Against Discrimination, and Quincy's municipal human rights commission. However, the mascot was cleared of the accusations after an extensive investigation. In 2017, Mayor Thomas P. Koch called Yakoo a symbol of pride and said the issue shouldn't be dictated by "social justice zealots out there who know what’s best for everybody."

Following the murder of George Floyd, there was a renewed push to change the mascot. A petition collected several thousand signatures and led to an open letter from a group of North Quincy students to administrators alleging racially hostile behavior at the school.

In an effort to preserve the legacy of the Yakoo while modernizing it, original illustrator Peter Fredericksen redrew the mascot with the creative input of Yacubian. A revision of the mascot was unveiled in August 2020, retaining the caricature of Yacubian as originally drawn, but donning the outfit of a patriot of the Revolutionary War era, with a scroll in hand in lieu of a rock, tripoint hat in place of a Mohawk, and the removal of the arrowhead and feathers.

== Exchange programs ==
Courses in French, Italian, Spanish, and Mandarin are offered. The foreign language department conducts two exchange programs that alternate each year. One program is between NQHS Italian students and the Prima Maggiore Vittoria Collona Liceo Linguistico located in Arezzo, Italy. There is also an exchange program conducted between French students at NQHS and students at the Ste. Marie de Bourges School in Bourges, France. A trip to Spain is also coordinated by various Spanish teachers.

== Notable alumni ==
- John B. Allen (MrBallen)- Former Navy seal, YouTuber and Podcaster
- Louis Bell - record producer
- William R. Caddy, World War II Medal of Honor recipient
- Karen Cashman, Olympic speed skating bronze medalist
- Dick Donovan, Major League Baseball pitcher
- Joe Dudek, Denver Broncos running back
- Esther Earl, online activist and internet vlogger
- Don Kent, meteorologist
- Ralph McLeod, Major League Baseball player
- Mike Mitchell, actor and comedian
- Donald Murray, columnist, Boston Globe (did not graduate)
- Will Murray, prolific novelist, historian of popular culture
- Elisabeth Ogilvie, author
- Everett P. Pope, World War II Medal of Honor recipient
- Mary Pratt, All-American Girls Professional Baseball League player
- Charles Sweeney, U.S Air Force major general, pilot for the atomic bombing of Nagasaki
- Pete Varney, Major League Baseball player
- Robert Burns Woodward, Nobel Prize chemist
- Scotty Whitelaw, Commissioner of the Eastern College Athletic Conference

== Gallery ==
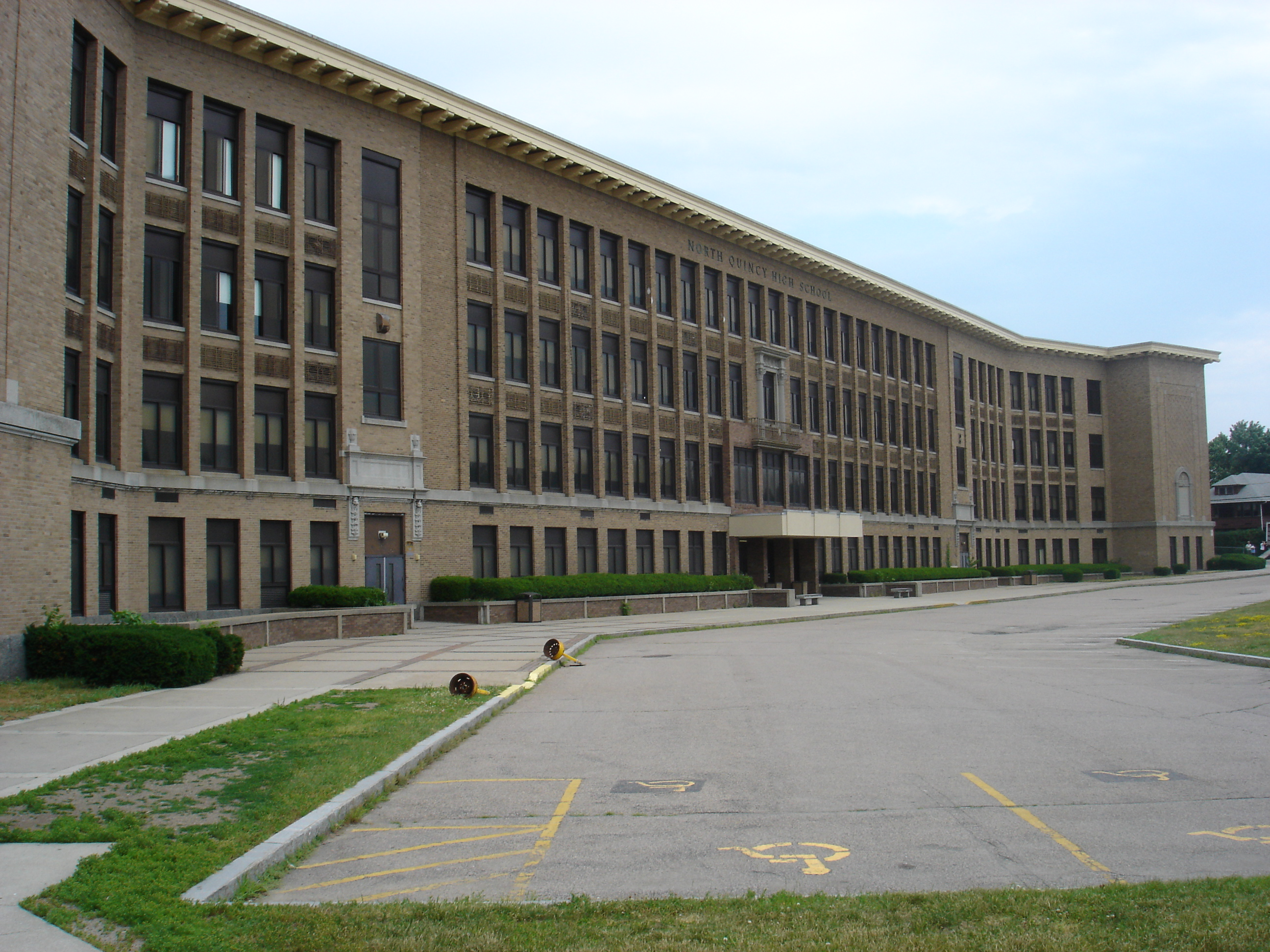
The façade of North Quincy High School

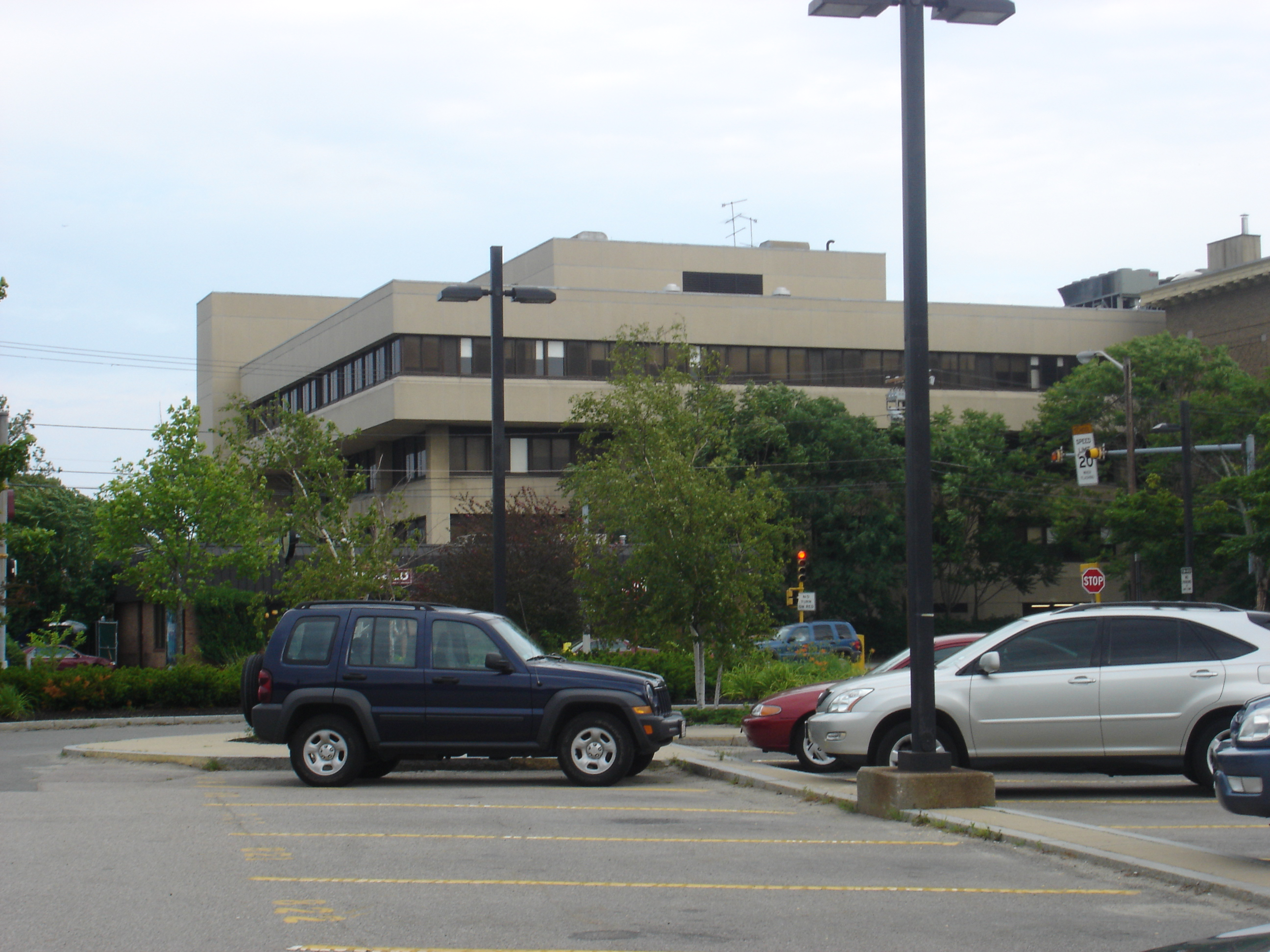
The newer wing of the school, as seen from the North Quincy T station

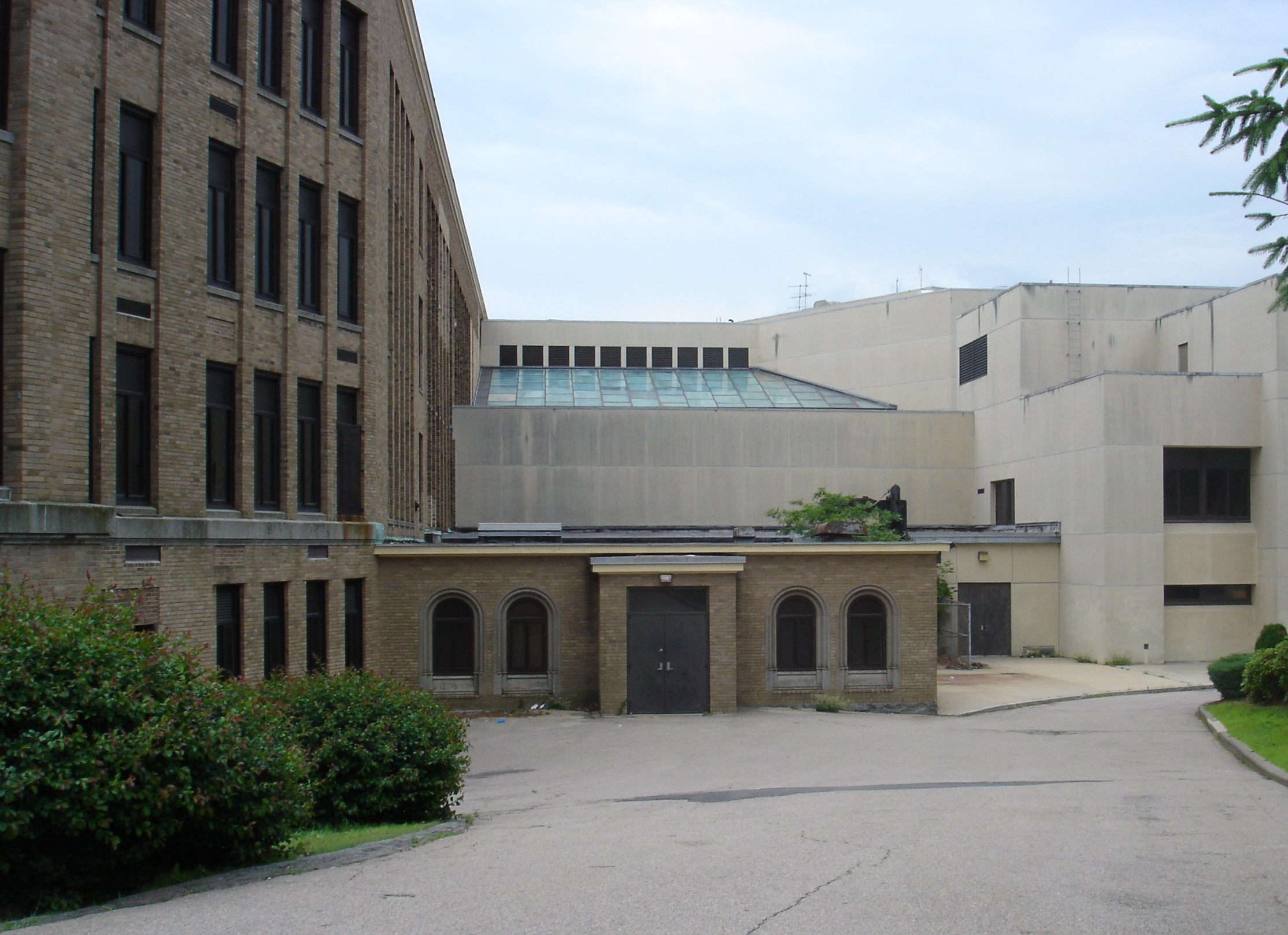
A side view of the school, showing the connection of the newer wing to the original structure
