= Charles H. Porter (mayor) =

American politician

Mayor of Quincy, Massachusetts
- In office 1889–1890
- Preceded by: Office created
- Succeeded by: Henry O. Fairbanks

Personal details
- Born: April 3, 1843 Weymouth, Massachusetts
- Died: August 10, 1911 (aged 68) Quincy, Massachusetts
- Party: Republican

Charles Hunt Porter (1843–1911) was an American businessman and politician who served as the first mayor of Quincy, Massachusetts.

== Early life ==
Porter was born on April 3, 1843, in Weymouth, Massachusetts. When he was six weeks old his family moved to Quincy, Massachusetts, where he resided for the remainder of his life. He attended grammar and high school in Quincy and engaged in the insurance business until July 1, 1862, when he enlisted in the Union Army. Porter served in the 39th Massachusetts Regiment for three years during the American Civil War. He mustered out as a captain, but was later given an honorary commission as a lieutenant colonel.

== Business career ==
Upon his return from the war, Porter returned to the insurance business with W. Porter & Co. He later became a partner of the firm. He also served as a director of the Quincy Mutual Fire Insurance Co., a trustee of the Quincy Savings Bank, and director/president of the Quincy Water Co.

Porter was the president of the Boston Red Stockings of the National League from 1873 through 1874. During his tenure as president, the club made a tour of England. In 1900, Porter was part of a group that attempted to secure a Boston franchise in the new American League. Porter negotiated a deal for the club to play in Charles River Park in Cambridge, Massachusetts, and had selected a person to manage the affairs of the team, but his group backed out after the league's backers met with a rival group. Boston would join the American League in 1901 when Cleveland businessman Charles Somers formed what would become the Boston Red Sox.

Porter was a member of the Adams Academy's board of management from the school's organization in 1871 until 1888.

== Political career ==
Porter was a member of the Quincy board of selectmen from 1879 to 1880. From 1881 to 1882 he represented Quincy and Weymouth in the Massachusetts House of Representatives. In 1888, Porter was elected Mayor of Quincy in the city's first mayoral election. Porter also served on Quincy's school committee for seven years and was a member of the inaugural Quincy's park commission.

Porter served a member of the state board of health during the governorships of Roger Wolcott and Curtis Guild Jr. In 1899 he was appointed to the state civil service commission. In 1910 he was appointed by Governor Eben Sumner Draper to serve on a commission that investigated and reported on the care of tuberculosis patients.

== Illness and death ==
Porter underwent an operation in the spring of 1910. His health declined afterwards and he died on August 10, 1911, at his home in Quincy.
