= Chester I. Campbell =

American politician

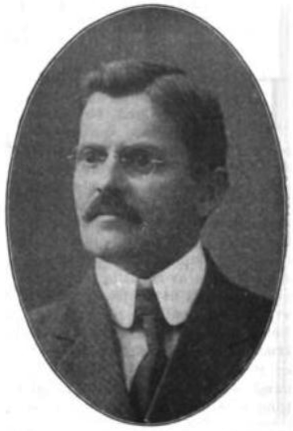

Member of the Massachusetts Governor's Council from the 2nd District
- In office 1927–1933
- Preceded by: Washington Cook
- Succeeded by: Joseph B. Grossman

Mayor of Quincy, Massachusetts
- In office 1915–1915
- Preceded by: Joseph L. Whiton (acting)
- Succeeded by: Gustave B. Bates

Personal details
- Born: May 16, 1869 Providence, Rhode Island
- Died: January 20, 1933 (aged 63) Belmont, Massachusetts
- Party: Republican
- Occupation: Industrial expositions manager

Chester I. Campbell (May 16, 1869 – January 20, 1933) was an American exposition promoter and politician who served as mayor of Quincy, Massachusetts, was a member of the Massachusetts Governor's Council, and was an unsuccessful candidate for Lieutenant Governor of Massachusetts.

== Early life ==
Campbell was born on May 16, 1869, in Providence, Rhode Island. He attended public school in Providence.

== Business career ==
Campbell began his business career as a bicycle salesman and organized the country's first safety bicycle race. His first exposition was a Bicycle Show in his hometown of Providence. In 1902, Campbell relocated his business from Providence to Boston. That same year he organized the first Boston Automotive Show.

Campbell organized some of New England's largest industrial expositions, including the National Motorboat and Engine Show, the National Flower Show, the Home Beautiful Exposition, and the Sportsmen's Shows.

== Trade associations ==
In 1902, Campbell formed the Boston Automobile Dealers' Association. He was the organization's secretary from its founding until his death. In this position, he fought against Massachusetts General Court legislation seen as having a negative impact on motorists, including increased taxation.

Campbell also organized the Textile Exhibitors Association and served as its secretary and treasurer from 1918 until his death in 1933.

In 1925, Campbell helped form the New England Council. He served as the organization's temporary secretary.

== Political career ==
In 1914, Campbell was a candidate for Mayor of Quincy. He finished first in the Republican primary, with 1,563 votes to Charles H. Johnson's 741, Henry F. Tilden's 537, and Gustave B. Bates' 391. He also defeated Bates in the Progressive Party primary 84 votes to 12. Campbell won the general election by a plurality of 1,331 votes. Bates defeated Campbell for the Republican nomination the following year, 1,796 votes to 1,098. Following his loss, Campbell entered the race under the "Republican-Citizens" designation, but was unsuccessful.

During World War I, Campbell served as director of the Federal Bureau of Expositions at a salary of $1. In this position he oversaw the United States government's war exhibitions.

From 1927 to 1933, Campbell represented the 2nd District on the Massachusetts Governor's Council. In 1932, he was a candidate for Lieutenant Governor of Massachusetts, but lost the Republican primary to Gaspar Bacon.

== Personal life ==
In 1902, Campbell moved from Providence to the Wollaston neighborhood of Quincy and owned an extensive amount of property near Melvin Village, New Hampshire, on Lake Winnipesaukee, including a hotel and summer camp.

Beginning in 1908, Campbell organized and directed an annual outing for handicapped, orphaned, and underprivileged children.

== Death ==
On January 20, 1933, Campbell collapsed while making a speech in Belmont, Massachusetts. The fire and police departments responded and attempted to revive him with a Pulmotor, but were unsuccessful. Campbell's death came on the eve of the opening of his annual Automobile Show at Mechanics Hall.
