= Henry O. Fairbanks =

American mayor (1852–1928)

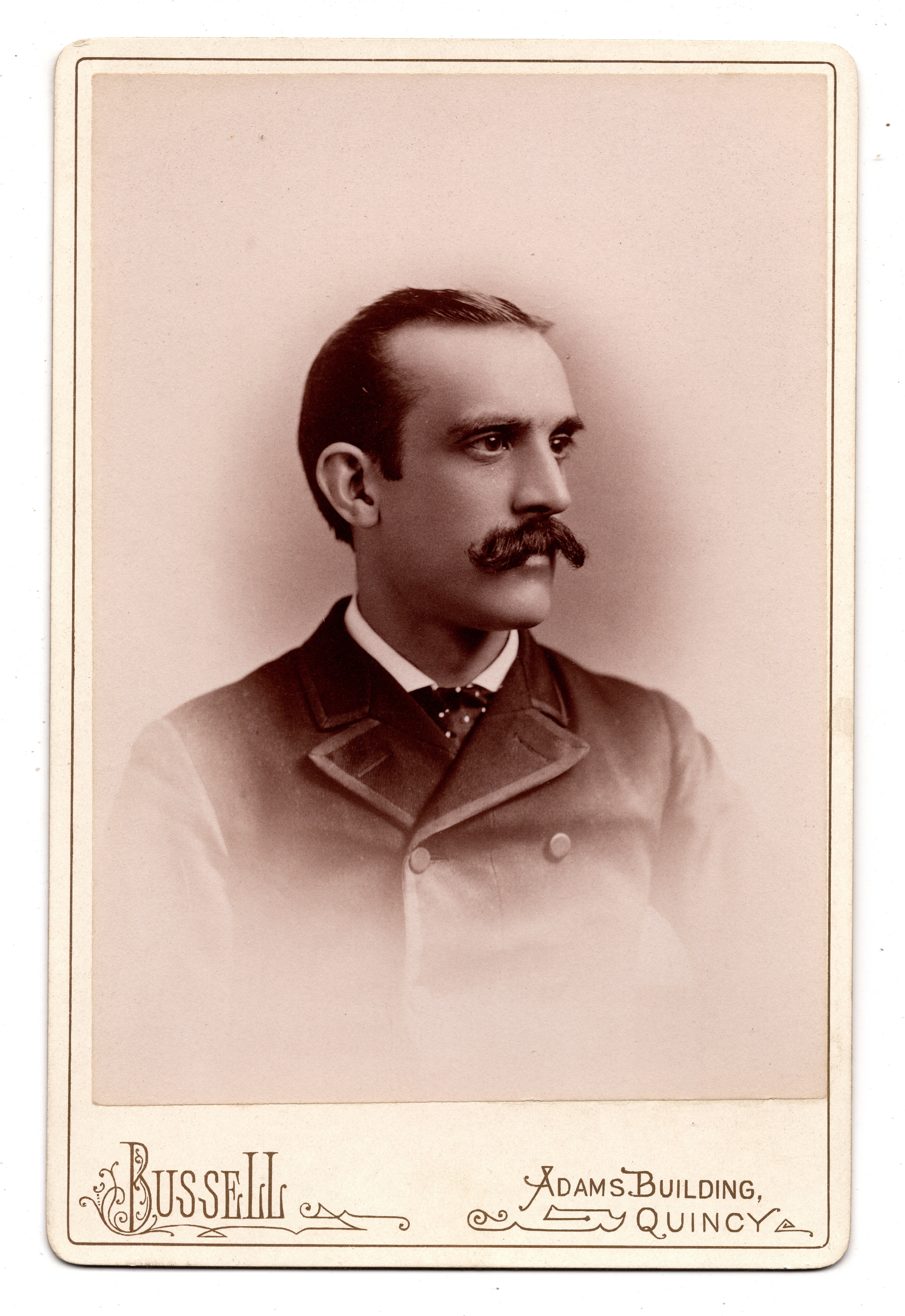

Mayor of Quincy, Massachusetts
- In office 1890–1893
- Preceded by: Charles H. Porter
- Succeeded by: William A. Hodges

President of the Quincy, Massachusetts Common Council

Member of the Quincy, Massachusetts Common Council Ward 5

Personal details
- Born: June 21, 1853 Boston, Massachusetts, US
- Died: February 29, 1928 (aged 75) Quincy, Massachusetts, US
- Resting place: Jamaica Plain, Massachusetts
- Party: Republican
- Education: Boston English High School, 1869
- Profession: Flour merchant

Henry Orlestus Fairbanks (1852–1928) was the second mayor of Quincy, Massachusetts.

== Bibliography ==
- History of Norfolk County, Massachusetts, 1622–1918, Volume II, edited by Louis Atwood Cook. Published by S. J. Clarke Publishing Company, 1918. pp. 74–79.
- Massachusetts of Today: A Memorial of the State, Historical and Biographical, Issued for the World's Columbian Exposition at Chicago, page 435, (1892).
