= William J. Phelan =

American lawyer

Attorney, Phelan Law

1989 - Present

Town Administrator of Holbrook, Massachusetts
- In office March 8, 2011 – May 15, 2015
- Preceded by: Michael Yunits
- Succeeded by: Edward O’Brien (interim)

Mayor of Quincy, Massachusetts
- In office 2002–2008
- Preceded by: James A. Sheets
- Succeeded by: Thomas P. Koch

Personal details
- Party: Democratic
- Occupation: Attorney; Town Administrator; Politician

William J. Phelan is an American attorney, former mayor and town administrator, and politician. He served as Mayor of Quincy, Massachusetts from 2002 to 2008 and town administrator of Holbrook, Massachusetts, from 2011 to 2015.

== Early life ==
Phelan graduated from North Quincy High School in 1978. He was a standout basketball player and was elected to the school's athletic hall of fame. Phelan earned a bachelor's degree from Suffolk University and a J.D. degree from the Suffolk University Law School. He worked as a counselor for the Massachusetts Department of Youth Services before beginning a law practice in Quincy in 1989.

== Quincy school committee ==
Phelan first ran for public office in 1999 as a candidate for the Quincy school committee. During his term on the school board, Phelan clashed with mayor James A. Sheets over the location of the new high school. Phelan successfully blocked Sheets' plan to build the school on contaminated land at a former industrial site in Quincy Point.

== Mayor of Quincy ==
=== First term ===
In 2001, Phelan challenged Sheets for mayor. It was the first time that Sheets had faced a competitive election since he was first elected in 1989. During the campaign, Phelan criticized Sheets for rising taxes, the unsuccessful effort to reopen the Fore River Shipyard, and for "putting the interests of the developers ahead of the people". Sheets in turn faulted Phelan for his lack of experience, running a negative campaign, and for not putting forward ideas of his own. Phelan defeated Sheets by fifteen votes in the general election. After a recount, the margin of victory was increased to seventeen votes and Sheets conceded the election.

During Phelan's first days in office he was faced with a $4 million budget deficit due to reduced revenue from taxes and fees, including a $1.5 million reduction in the fees paid by the Massachusetts Water Resources Authority, as well as a reduction in local aid from the state government. He was able to avoid layoffs by instituting an early retirement program for city employees, which reduced the city's workforce by over 100 employees. He also had to deal with anger arising from an increase in local property taxes. In September 2002, Phelan suspended eight Quincy police officers for misconduct, which included drinking while on duty, firing weapons in the air, driving under the influence of alcohol, allowing one of the officers girlfriend's to drive a police cruiser, and attempting to cover up the incident, that occurred while they were working a paid detail at a nightclub.

In 2003, Phelan negotiated a new lease with Quarry Hills Associates, which ran the newly opened Granite Links Golf Club at Quarry Hills, that would give the city 10% of the club's gross revenues. That June he vetoed a proposed ordinance that would've implement minimum staffing requirements for the fire department, stating that the city could not afford the cost of the requirements (which he stated would be $8 million over five years). The veto was criticized by the president of the Quincy Firefighters Association, who accused Phelan of not making public safety a priority. Fire Chief Paul O'Connell also objected to the ordinance, citing the cost as well as the fact that only two other municipalities in the country had adopted these staffing requirements. In July 2003, Phelan presented a city budget that called for no layoffs, preserved most city services, and increased the amount of money in the city's reserves.

=== Second term ===
In the 2003 election, Phelan faced a last-minute challenge from city councilor Joseph F. Newton. Newton criticized Phelan for moving slowly with plans for a new Quincy high school as well as the poor condition of the city's infrastructure. Phelan was reelected with 73% of the vote, defeating Newton 13,117 votes to 4,775.

In 2004, facing pressure from the Quincy Taxpayers Association, the Quincy city council voted to make $700,000 in specific cuts and cut the budget by another $2.1 million without identifying where the cuts would be made. Phelan criticized the council, stating that "Rather than do the job and identify cuts, the City Council decided to take credit for the cuts but not take responsibility for the pain the cuts will cause." Councilor Joseph G. Finn countered, stating "The mayor's the guy in charge. We don't manage. We're not the administrators." The cuts came after Quincy residents saw their property taxes increase over 45% in four years, the highest of all South Shore communities, due to an increase in property value. The city solicitor, based on an opinion from the Massachusetts Department of Revenue, ruled that the council's vote to cut the budget without specifying what was to be cut was invalid, but upheld the $700,000 in specific cuts.

By 2005, the city's reserves had tripled and its bond rating had improved. Phelan used the reserves to pay for a road rebuilding program and increase the school department budget. He also began working on plans for a 65-acre park on the Broadmeadows marshes and the improvement and reconstruction of downtown Quincy. He was also rumored to be a candidate for Lieutenant Governor or another state-wide office in the 2006 election. He ran unopposed in that year's election.

=== Third term ===
During his third term as mayor, Phelan created a citywide full-day kindergarten, hired additional teachers and classroom aides, cut the high school drop-out rate in half, planted more than 100 trees and implemented a nationally recognized 10-year plan to end chronic homelessness. In 2007, seventeen of the eighteen city worker unions were working without a contract due to conflicts over health insurance costs, which had grown from $18 million in 2002 to $40 million. At that time, the city paid 90% of health insurance premiums for most city employees. That June, all 890-members of the teachers union went on strike, which resulted in the closure of all nineteen of the city's schools. The strike ended after four days when the union and school committee reached a tentative contract agreement.

In February 2007, Phelan's park's commissioner, Thomas P. Koch (a holdover from the Sheets administration), resigned and declared his candidacy for mayor.

=== 2009 election ===
On June 2, 2009, Phelan announced that he would challenge Koch in that year's election. The race between Koch and Phelan was described by Boston Globe reporter Robert Preer as "one of Quincy's most rancorous mayoral elections in decades". The two candidates sparred over the issue of property taxes - Phelan criticized Koch for implementing the largest tax increase in city history while Koch blamed Phelan's administration for leaving him with a large budget deficit that necessitated the increase. They also accused each other of engaging in patronage and deceptive campaigning. During the campaign, WCVB-TV reported that supporters and relatives of Koch who resided outside of the city had voted in the previous election. Both sides challenged the residency of a few of the other's supporters. Koch defeated Phelan.

== Holbrook town administrator ==
In March 2011, Phelan was offered the position of town administrator of Holbrook, Massachusetts. The Holbrook board of selectmen voted 5 to 0 on March 8, 2011, to appoint Phelan as interim town administrator. That October he was offered the permanent position.

In December 2011, Phelan was criticized by members of Holbrook's school committee for discussing school regionalization with the town manager of Abington, Massachusetts, after town meeting voted against it. In April 2013, the chairman of the Holbrook finance committee filed an ethics complaint against Phelan, alleging that an e-mail Phelan sent to him in error demonstrated at least an appearance of conflict with regard to the school committee election. A spreadsheet attached to the e-mail appeared to be a contact list for the purpose of influencing the election. Phelan said he wrote the e-mail on his own time and sent it from a personal account. No violation of state ethics laws was found to have occurred.

Phelan resigned as town administrator on May 15, 2015.
