= William R. Caddy =

US Marine Corps Medal of Honor recipient (1925–1945)

William Robert Caddy
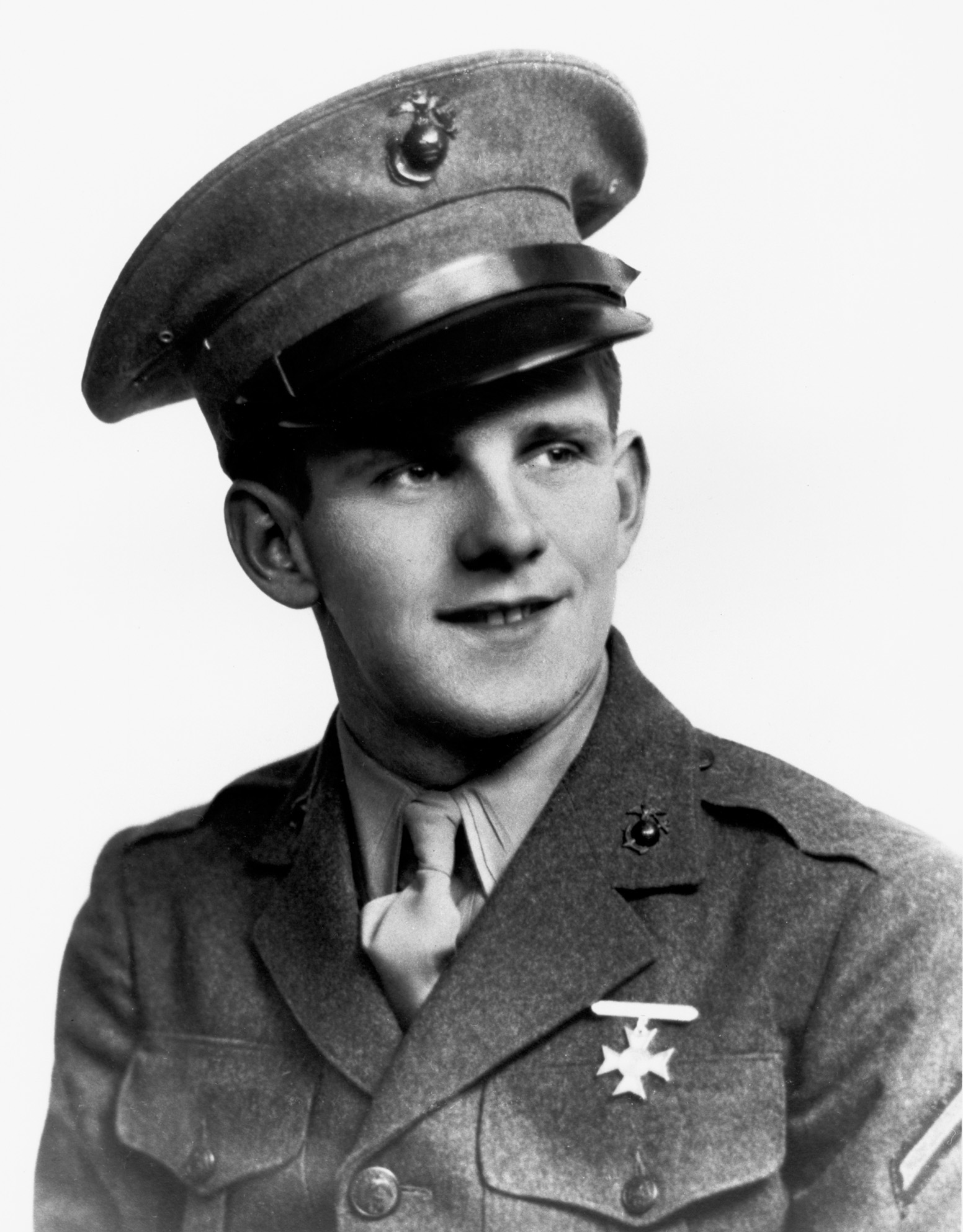
- Born: August 8, 1925; Quincy, Massachusetts, US
- Died: March 3, 1945 (aged 19); Iwo Jima, Volcano Islands, Japanese Empire
- Burial place: initially the 5th Marine Division Cemetery on Iwo Jima later reinterred in the U.S. National Memorial Cemetery of the Pacific Honolulu, Hawaii
- Military career
- Allegiance: United States
- Branch: United States Marine Corps
- Service years: 1943–1945
- Rank: Private First Class
- Units: 3rd Battalion, 26th Marines, 5th Marine Division
- Conflicts: World War II; Pacific War; Japan campaign; Volcano and Ryukyu Islands campaign; Battle of Iwo Jima †
- Awards: Medal of Honor; Purple Heart

William Robert Caddy (August 8, 1925 – March 3, 1945) was a United States Marine who sacrificed his life to save the lives of his platoon leader and platoon sergeant during the Battle of Iwo Jima. For his bravery, Caddy posthumously received his nation's highest military decoration – the Medal of Honor. He was the 72nd Marine of World War II to receive this honor.

Caddy dropped out of high school after two years and worked. He gave most of his earnings to his mother before being drafted in the Marine Corps in 1943. Caddy attended training and was sent overseas to the Pacific Theatre of World War II aboard the USS Arthur Middleton. After the Middleton, Caddy went to Hawaii for training and then went to Iwo Jima aboard the USS Darke (APA-159). For the next 12 days, he fought with his unit on the island until getting killed March 3, 1945, when an enemy grenade landed near him and Caddy sacrificed himself by smothering the blast with his body.

== Early years ==
William Robert Caddy was born on August 8, 1925, in Quincy, Massachusetts, and attended the schools of Quincy until high school. In high school, he was selected to the schools varsity baseball team, but he left school after his second year. Caddy worked as a helper on a milkman's truck for a while and gave most of his $25 a week pay over to his mother.

== Marine Corps service ==
Caddy was inducted into the United States Marine Corps through the Selective Service system on October 27, 1943, and was put on inactive duty until November 10, when he was ordered to Marine Corps Recruit Depot Parris Island, South Carolina, for recruit training. While attending recruit training, Caddy received training on several weapons in use at the time including the M50 Reising submachine gun, Browning Automatic Rifle (BAR), M1 carbine, bayonet and hand grenade. When it came time to qualify with the service rifle, he fired a score of 305, qualifying him as a sharpshooter.

Following his 10-day recruit furlough, PFC Caddy reported into the Special Weapons Group, Base Artillery Battalion at Camp Lejeune, North Carolina, for instruction in the Oerlikon anti-aircraft gun. Upon the successful completion of the course, in which his rating was "good", Caddy was assigned to a rifle company in the new 5th Marine Division which was then forming. His unit was Company I, 3rd Battalion, 26th Marines. After extensive training in North Carolina, the new division shipped overland to San Diego where, on July 22, 1944, PFC Caddy headed overseas to the Pacific theatre on the USS Arthur Middleton (APA-25). He participated in further training at Hilo, Hawaii, where the 5th Division encamped for five months. On January 5, 1945, rifleman Caddy boarded an attack transport, the USS Darke for the island of Iwo Jima.

Landing against fierce opposition, PFC Caddy went through the fighting on Iwo Jima for 12 days. On March 3, 1945, he, along with his platoon leader and his acting platoon sergeant, were advancing against shattering Japanese machine-gun and small arms fire in an isolated sector. Seeking temporary refuge from the assault, the three Marines dropped into a shell hole where they were immediately pinned down by a well-concealed enemy sniper. After several unsuccessful attempts to advance further, the 19-year-old Marine and his lieutenant, Ott C. Farris, engaged in a furious hand grenade battle with the defending Japanese. When an enemy grenade landed in their hole, PFC Caddy immediately covered it with his body and absorbed the deadly fragments.

The Medal of Honor was presented to his mother at ceremonies on the Montclair Elementary School lawn (which the Marine had formerly attended) on September 8, 1946, by Rear Admiral Morton L. Deyo, Commandant of the First Naval District. Among those present were the Lieutenant Governor of Massachusetts, the Mayor of Quincy, and the United States Congressman from that district.

Private First Class Caddy was initially buried in the 5th Marine Division Cemetery on Iwo Jima and was later reinterred in the U.S. National Memorial Cemetery of the Pacific in Honolulu, Hawaii, in 1948.

== Medal of Honor citation ==
The President of the United States takes pride in presenting the MEDAL OF HONOR posthumously to

PRIVATE FIRST CLASS WILLIAM R. CADDY
UNITED STATES MARINE CORPS RESERVE

for service as set forth in the following CITATION:

For conspicuous gallantry and intrepidity at the risk of his life above and beyond the call of duty while serving as a Rifleman with Company I, Third Battalion, Twenty-sixth Marines, Fifth Marine Division, in action against enemy Japanese forces during the seizure of Iwo Jima in the Volcano Islands, 3 March 1945. Consistently aggressive, Private First Class Caddy boldly defied shattering Japanese machine-gun and small-arms fire to move forward with his platoon leader and another Marine during a determined advance of his company through an isolated sector and, gaining the comparative safety of a shell hole, took temporary cover with his comrades. Immediately pinned down by deadly sniper fire from a well-concealed position, he made several unsuccessful attempts to again move forward and then, joined by his platoon leader, engaged the enemy in a fierce exchange of hand grenades until a Japanese grenade fell in the shell hole. Fearlessly disregarding all personal danger, Private First Class Caddy instantly threw himself upon the deadly missile, absorbing the exploding charge in his own body and protecting the others from serious injury. Stouthearted and indomitable, he unhesitatingly yielded his own life that his fellow Marines might carry on the relentless battle against a fanatic enemy. His dauntless courage and valiant spirit of self-sacrifice in the face of certain death reflects the highest credit upon Private First Class Caddy and the United States Naval Service. He gallantly gave his life for his country.

/S/ HARRY S TRUMAN

== Awards and decorations ==

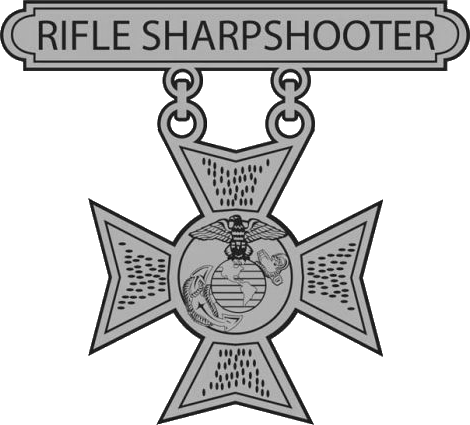

== Posthumous honors ==
The Marine Corps League's detachment #124, the William R. Caddy Detachment (Quincy, Massachusetts), was named in honor of the Marine Corps' Medal of Honor recipient in 1946.

In October 1963, Treasure Island Park in Quincy was renamed "P.F.C. William R. Caddy Memorial Park."

== See also ==
- List of Medal of Honor recipients for World War II
- List of Medal of Honor recipients for the Battle of Iwo Jima
