= Scotty Whitelaw =

American athlete, baseball coach, and commissioner

Robert M. "Scotty" Whitelaw (1927 – April 2, 2016) was an American athlete, baseball and basketball coach and long serving Commissioner of the Eastern College Athletic Conference.

Born in Quincy, Massachusetts, he played football and other sports for North Quincy High School and Springfield College. At Springfield, Whitelaw played center field on the baseball team and was New England's 600 yards champion for the track and field team.

In addition to serving as the ECAC Commissioner from 1971 to 1989, he also was the executive director of the National Invitation Tournament and baseball coach, basketball coach and assistant athletic director for MIT.

On March 9, 1989, the ECAC Hockey championship trophy was named the Whitelaw Cup as a tribute to the retiring ECAC Commissioner.
