= Thomas P. Koch =

33rd Mayor of Quincy, Massachusetts

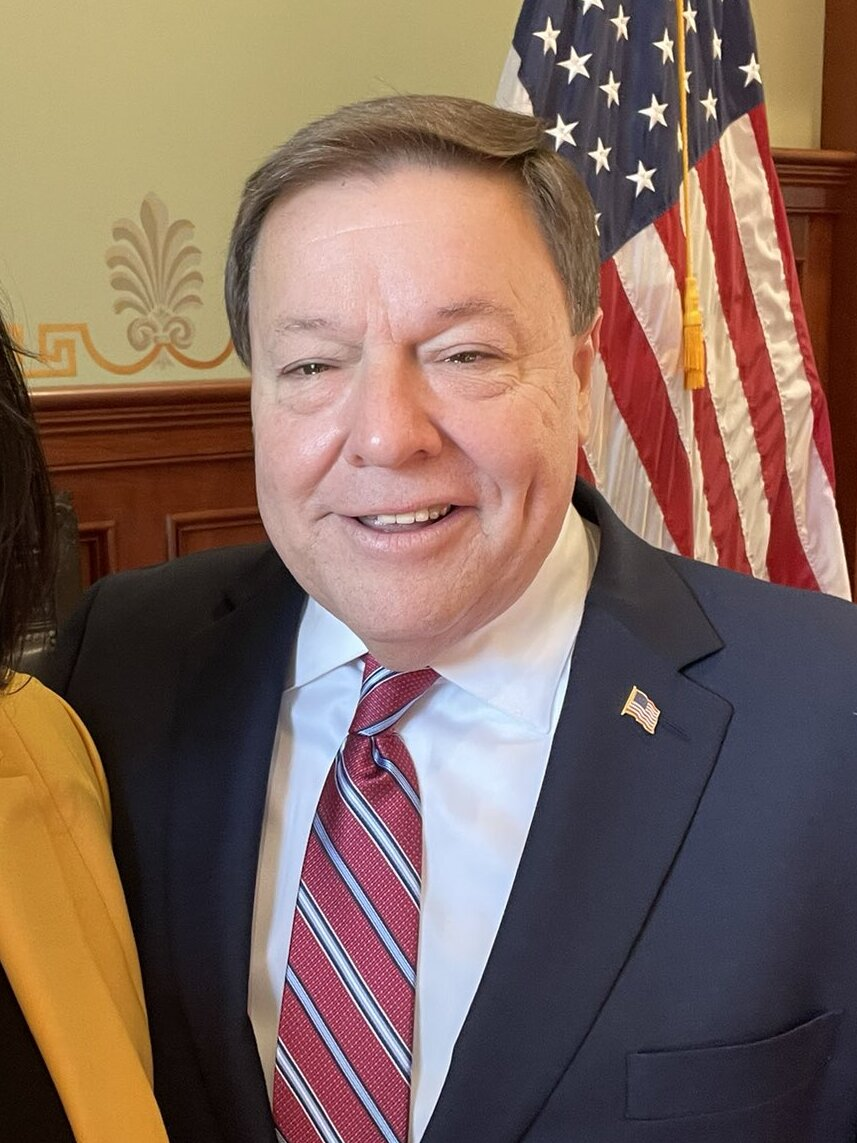
- Koch in 2024

33rd Mayor of Quincy, Massachusetts
- Incumbent
- Assumed office January 2, 2008
- Preceded by: William J. Phelan

Personal details
- Born: January 22, 1963 (age 63) Quincy, Massachusetts
- Party: Independent (since 2018); Democratic (until 2018)
- Spouse: Christine Keenan Koch
- Children: 3

Thomas P. Koch (/koʊk/ KOHK; born January 22, 1963) is the 33rd and current mayor of Quincy, Massachusetts.

== Biography ==
Thomas Koch was born and raised in Quincy, the sixth of seven children to Simone and Richard J. Koch. He is a 1981 graduate of North Quincy High School and was the class president. He took classes at the University of Massachusetts Boston but does not have a college degree. Quincy Mayor James Sheets appointed him his top aide in 1990. In 1995, he was appointed commissioner of the city's Park Department.

== Political career ==
In February 2007, Koch resigned and challenged Sheets' successor, William J. Phelan. Koch defeated Phelan 54% to 46% in that year's election. Koch defeated Phelan by a similar margin in a rematch two years later. Koch defeated Phelan once again in 2015, winning the first four-year mayoral term in Quincy's history. Koch also defeated then school committeewoman Anne Mahoney in 2011. Koch and Mahoney, then a city councilor, faced off again 2023, with Koch winning again.

A Democrat at the time, Koch endorsed Republican Charlie Baker in the 2014 Massachusetts gubernatorial election. Baker's opponent, Democrat Martha Coakley, alleged Koch endorsed Baker because Coakley unsuccessfully prosecuted Koch ally Tim Cahill two years prior. Koch left the Democratic Party in 2018 because of his anti-abortion views. Later that year, he endorsed Baker's bid for re-election in the 2018 Massachusetts gubernatorial election.

Koch has served as chairman of the MBTA Advisory Board since 2011. In August 2021, the MBTA Advisory Board selected Koch to serve as its representative on the MBTA Board of Directors.

During 2018, Koch was interim president of the municipally-affiliated Quincy College.

In June 2024, city councilors approved Koch's request to raise his salary from $159,000 to $285,000, which would make him one of the highest-paid mayors in the United States. Following public outcry, in October Koch said the raise would be deferred until after the 2027 mayoral election. Later that month, Koch said the raise had been deferred in part due to an investigation by the State Ethics Commission. The raise was rescinded by city councilors in June 2026 after an election saw several incumbents who had voted for the raises ousted from office.

In May 2025, a group of Quincy residents sued to prevent Koch from installing statues of Saint Michael the Archangel and Saint Florian on Quincy's public safety building, alleging that the statutes would "unduly entangle the government with religion" and violate the Massachusetts Constitution by elevating one religion above others. The lawsuit is backed by the ACLU, the Freedom from Religion Foundation, and Americans United for Separation of Church and State. Koch has justified the statues by saying that they “transcend religion and have a deep, long-held symbolic meaning of protection for our first responders. This is about them.” In October 2025, a Massachusetts Superior Court Judge issued an injunction prohibiting the city from installing the statues until the lawsuit is resolved. The Massachusetts Supreme Judicial Court upheld the injunction in August 2026.

On September 22, 2025, Koch drew condemnation for his statements on clergy sexual abuse, in which he alleged that that the sexual abuse of "13 and 14 year olds" by adult clergy members constitutes "mostly homosexual issues, not pedophilia." Koch continued that he never saw any sexual abuse in the Catholic church growing up and accused teachers, coaches, and the Boy Scouts of being the "real" perpetrators. On September 26, 2025, a group of sexual abuse survivors and advocates protested at Quincy City Hall.

== Personal life ==
Koch is Roman Catholic. Koch is the brother-in-law of Massachusetts State Senator John F. Keenan. Koch has three adult children, including sons who are members of the Quincy Police Department and Quincy Fire Department.

Political offices
| Preceded by William J. Phelan | Mayor of Quincy, Massachusetts; January 2, 2008 - | Succeeded by incumbent |
