= USS Darke =

Haskell-class attack transport ship

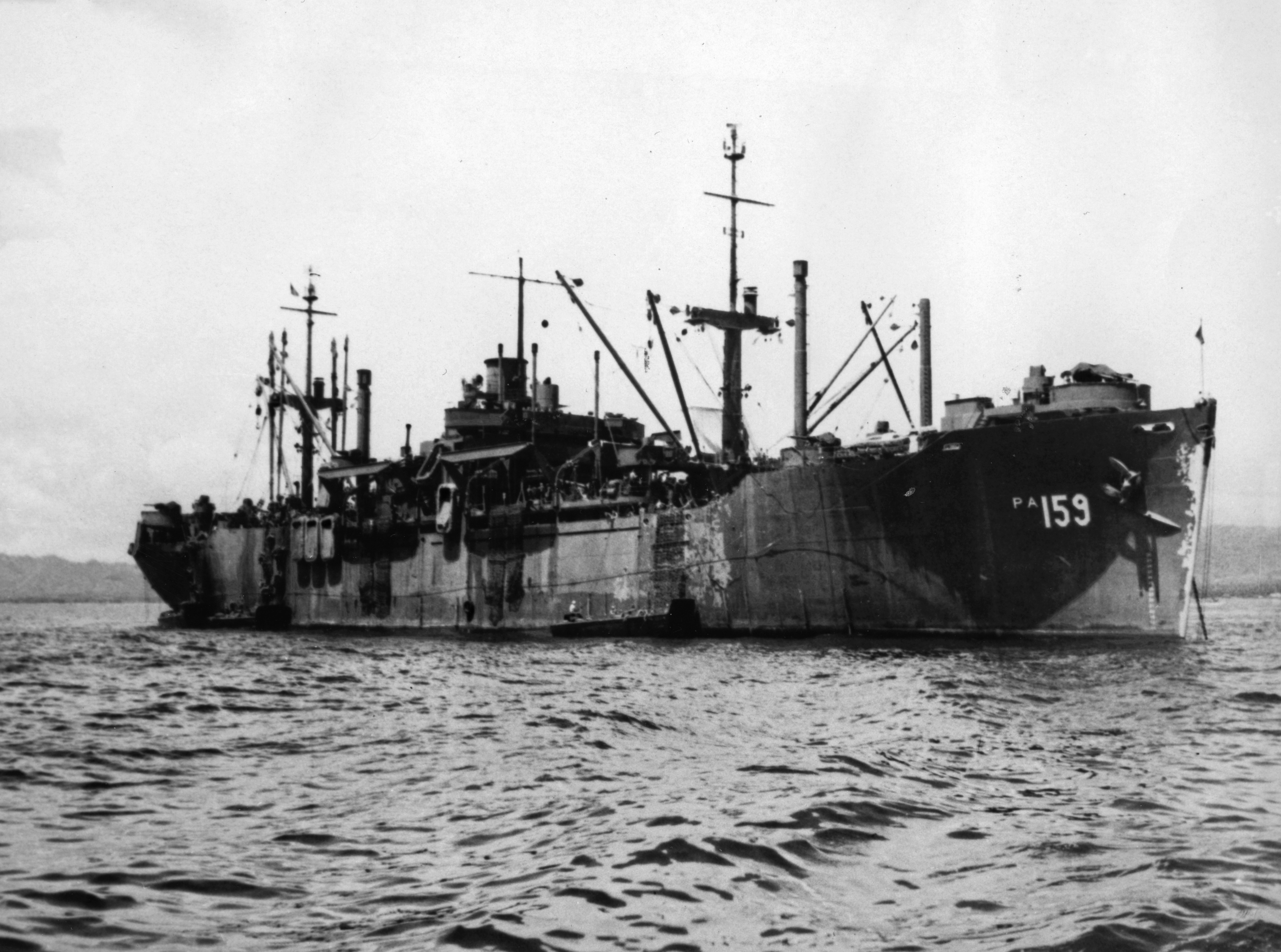

History

United States
- Name: Darke
- Namesake: Darke County, Ohio
- Builder: Oregon Shipbuilding
- Launched: 29 August 1944
- Commissioned: 10 October 1944
- Decommissioned: 17 April 1946
- Honors and awards: 2 Battle stars
- Fate: Scrapped 1974

General characteristics
- Class & type: Haskell-class attack transport
- Displacement: 6,873 tons
- Length: 455 ft (139 m)
- Beam: 62 ft (19 m)
- Draft: 24 ft (7.3 m)
- Propulsion: Oil Fired Steam Turbine; 1 Shaft
- Speed: 17 knots
- Boats & landing craft carried: 26
- Complement: 56 Officers, 480 Enlisted
- Armament: 1 5"/38 gun; 1 40 mm quad mount; 4 40 mm twin mounts; 10 20 mm single mounts

USS Darke (APA-159) was a Haskell-class attack transport in service with the United States Navy in from 1944 to 1946. She was scrapped in 1974.

== History ==
Darke was a Victory ship design, VC2-S-AP5 and was named after Darke County, Ohio, United States. She was launched 29 August 1944 by Oregon Shipbuilding Corp., Portland, Oregon, under a United States Maritime Commission contract; sponsored by Mrs. J. Hanson; transferred to the Navy 10 October 1944; and commissioned the same day.

=== World War II ===
Departing Port Hueneme, California, 4 December 1944, Darke joined in training in Hawaiian waters from 10 December to 27 January 1945, then sailed to Saipan for rehearsal landings. On 16 February she cleared for Iwo Jima, landing men of the 3rd Battalion, 26th Marines, 5th Marine Division during the assault on 19 February. She lay off the bitterly contested island unloading cargo and receiving casualties until 25 February when she sailed for Saipan, arriving 5 March. She sailed to Espiritu Santo to embark Army troops, and carried them by way of Saipan to Ulithi, staging point for the invasion of Okinawa. Darke landed these men as reinforcements at Okinawa from 9 to 14 April, returning to Ulithi 23 April to replenish. Loading two new LCMs at Guam, she got underway for San Pedro Bay, Leyte, arriving 29 May for duty training Army troops until the end of the war.

From 27 August to 6 October 1945 Darke made two voyages carrying troops from San Pedro Bay to Japan for the occupation. Assigned to "Magic Carpet" duty returning servicemen eligible for discharge to the United States, she cleared Hiro, Honshū, 11 October, embarking passengers at Guam, Guadalcanal, and Nouméa and arriving at San Francisco 18 November. From 30 November 1945 to 3 February 1946 she made two more voyages to bring home veterans from Pearl Harbor, Eniwetok, and Kwajalein. On 10 February she got underway from San Francisco for the East Coast, arriving at Norfolk 27 February. Darke was decommissioned 17 April 1946 and transferred to the Maritime Commission for disposal 22 April 1946.

=== Decommissioning and fate ===
Ex-Darke was laid up in the National Defense Reserve Fleet at James River, Virginia. Between 26 January and 14 March 1955 she was withdrawn from the Reserve Fleet for a Repair Program, GAA- Polarus, and returned. Ex-Darke was sold for $732,500 to Union Minerals & Alloys Corporation for scrapping on 16 July 1974. At 1110 EDT, on 5 September 1974 she was withdrawn from the Reserve Fleet and sent to the breaker's yard.

== Awards ==
Darke received two battle stars for World War II service.
