= Quincy High School (Massachusetts) =

- The Presidents Hat, mascot of Quincy High School

Location
- 100 Coddington Street; Quincy, Massachusetts 02169; United States
- Coordinates: 42°15′10″N 71°00′03″W

Information
- Type: Public
- Motto: Think For Yourself, Work Together, Share with the world, Be Aware of self and others(Think, Work, Share, Be Aware)
- Established: 1924
- School district: Quincy Public Schools
- Principal: Keith Ford
- Teaching staff: 118.31 (FTE)
- Grades: 9–12
- Enrollment: 1,514 (2024–2025)
- Student to teacher ratio: 12.80
- Campus: Urban
- Colors: Blue and White
- Nickname: Presidents
- Rival: North Quincy High School
- Website: qhs.quincypublicschools.com

Quincy High School (QHS) is a public secondary school located on Coddington Street in Quincy, Massachusetts, United States. It doubles as one of two high schools in the city of Quincy and as the vocational center. Quincy's mascot is known as the 'Presidents' and their school colors are blue and white.

== History ==
Quincy High School was founded in 1854 about a half-mile down Hancock Street (marked by the current High School Avenue) and moved to the former Central Middle School in 1894. It moved to Coddington Street in 1924. North Quincy High School was established at a separate location in 1926.

Construction of the new high school building was completed in 2010.

== Athletics ==
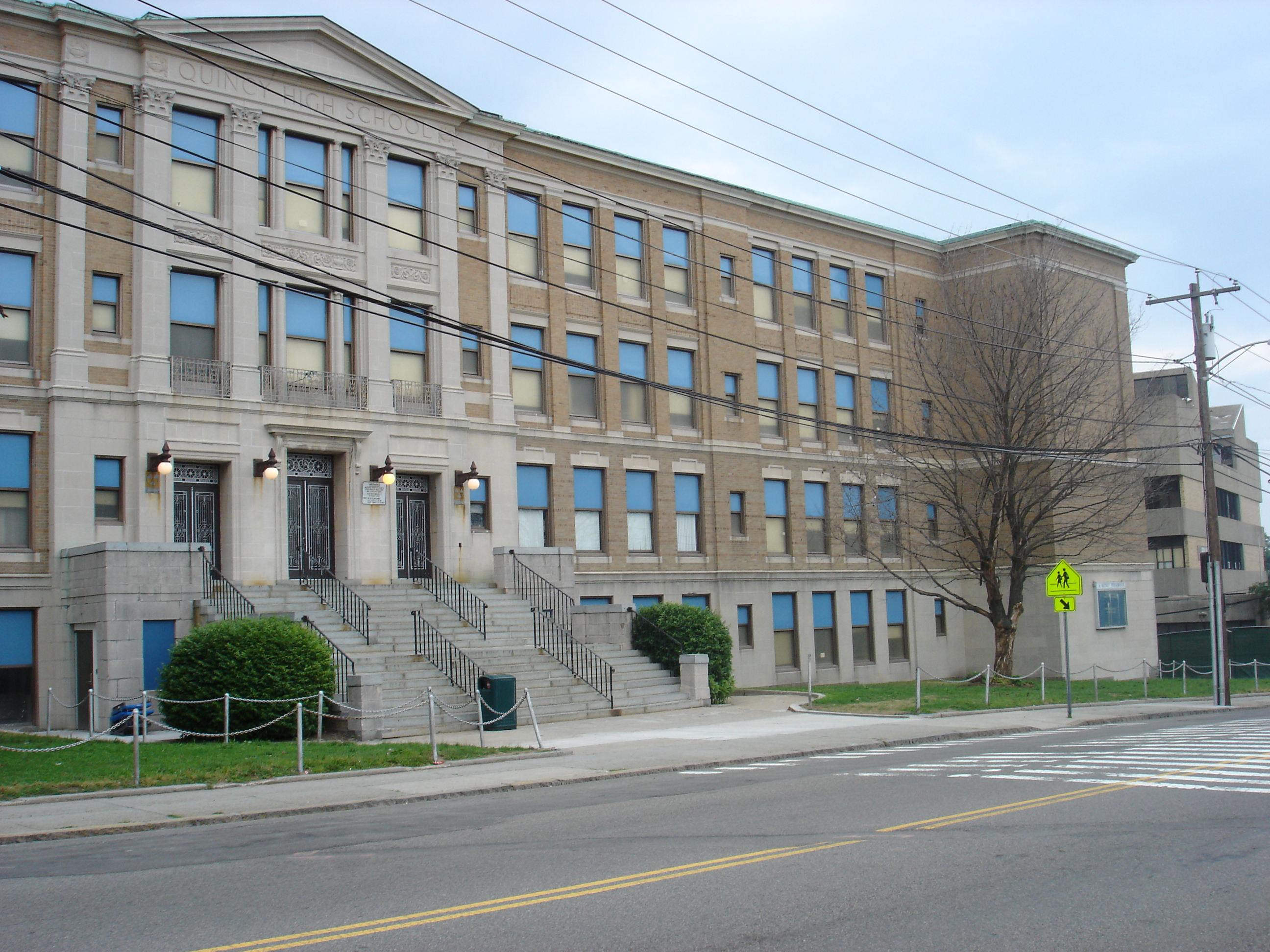
The now-demolished 1924 building of Quincy High School; the new school is to the right of the photo, in the place of the now-demolished Vocational Center depicted.

Quincy is part of the Patriot League, and previously competed in the Atlantic Coast and Old Colony Leagues.

As of 2018, Quincy High School has had consistent success recently in both boys' and girls' volleyball and basketball. The track teams at Quincy High have presented some of the top competing high school athletes in the state in recent years.

Its rival is North Quincy High School, which faces Quincy in the annual Thanksgiving football game at Veterans Memorial Stadium. Despite the rivalry, Quincy High's lacrosse, track, hockey, swimming, sailing, wrestling, and school band are joined with North Quincy's.

== Notable alumni ==
- Priscilla Chan - philanthropist and wife of Facebook founder Mark Zuckerberg
- John Cheever - author
- Dick Dale - surf guitarist, attended Quincy High School through the 11th grade.
- Ruth Gordon - actress
- Huntington "Tack" Hardwick - All-American college football star and original owner of the NHL Chicago Blackhawks
- Luis Marden - longtime photographer for National Geographic Magazine.
- Paul Reardon - Justice of the Massachusetts Supreme Judicial Court
- Robert Burns Woodward - awarded the Nobel Prize in Chemistry in 1965.
