= Quincy Savings Bank =

- U.S. National Register of Historic Places
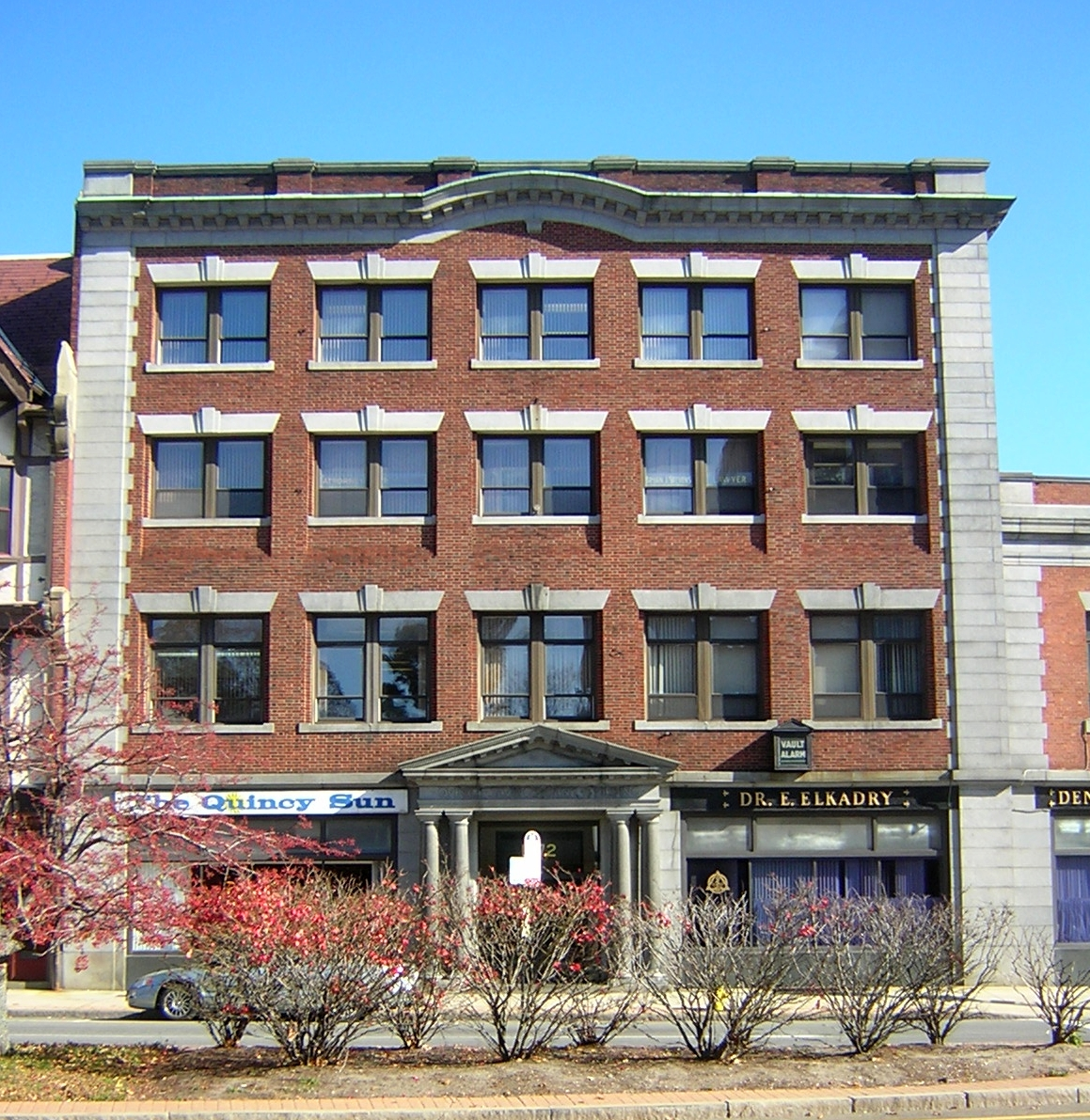

- Location within Massachusetts Location within the United States
- Location: 1370 Hancock St., Quincy, Massachusetts
- Coordinates: 42°15′1″N 71°0′9″W
- Area: 0.2 acres (0.081 ha)
- Built: 1897
- Architectural style: Classical Revival
- MPS: Quincy MRA
- NRHP reference No.: 89001350
- Added to NRHP: September 20, 1989

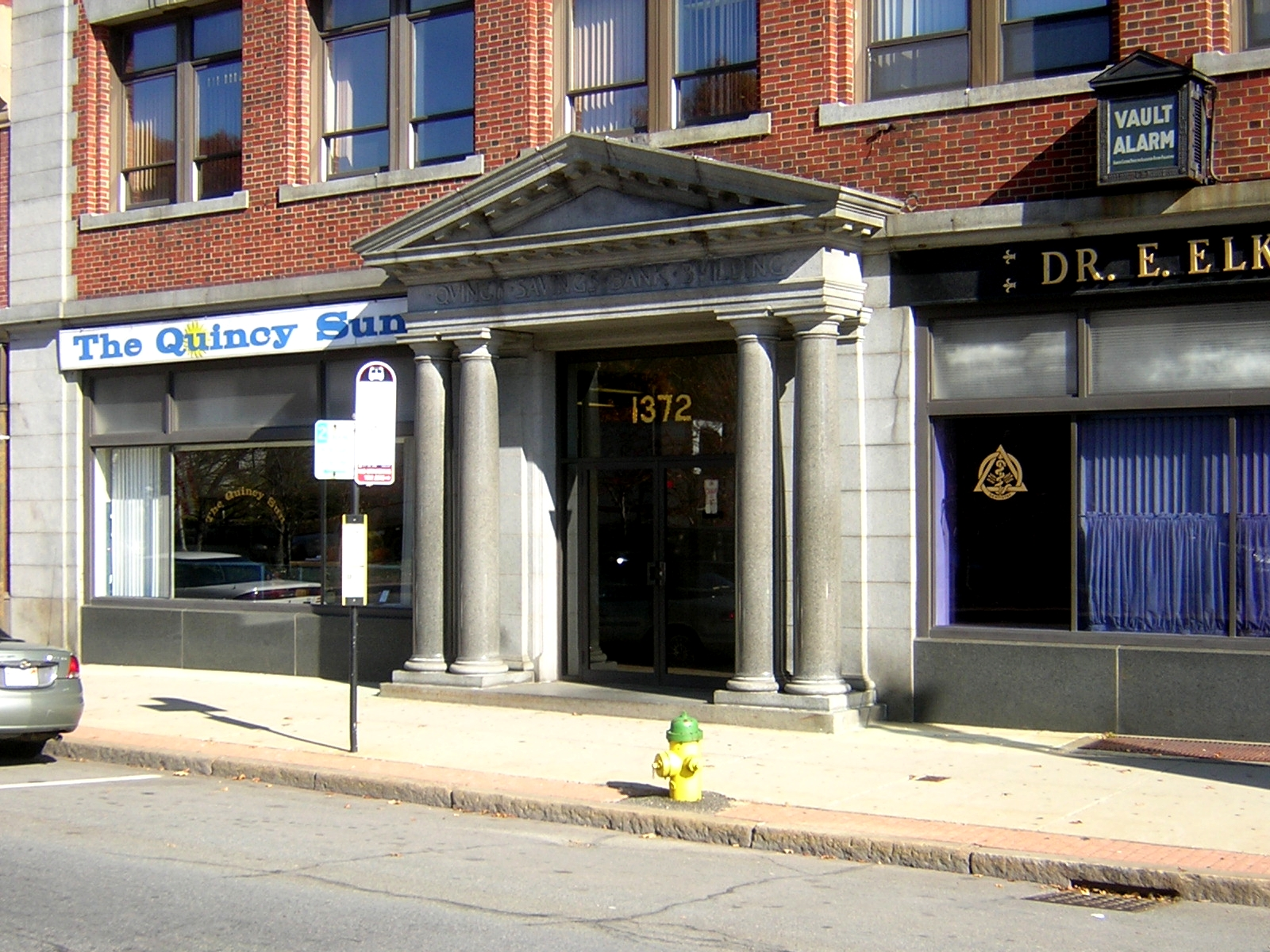

The Quincy Savings Bank building is a historic bank building at 1372 Hancock Street in Quincy, Massachusetts. Built in 1897, this four-story brick Classical Revival building is one of only two surviving 19th century commercial buildings in Quincy Center. Distinctive features include the granite quoining at the corners, and entrance portico with doubled Doric columns and a granite pediment. It was the fourth home for the bank, which was founded in 1845. Quincy Savings Bank was acquired by Citizens Bank in 1995.

The building was listed on the National Register of Historic Places in 1989.

== See also ==
- National Register of Historic Places listings in Quincy, Massachusetts
