= Quincy Public Schools =

Public school district of Quincy, Massachusetts, USA

Location
- 34 Coddington Street, Quincy, MA 02169 United States

District information
- Type: Public
- Grades: K-12
- Superintendent: Kevin W. Mulvey
- Schools: 19
- Budget: $153,147,901 total $16,463 per pupil (2016)

Students and staff
- Students: 9,229
- Teachers: 679
- Student–teacher ratio: 13.7 to 1

Other information
- Average SAT scores: 541 verbal 565 math 1106 total (2017-2018)
- Website: Quincy Public Schools

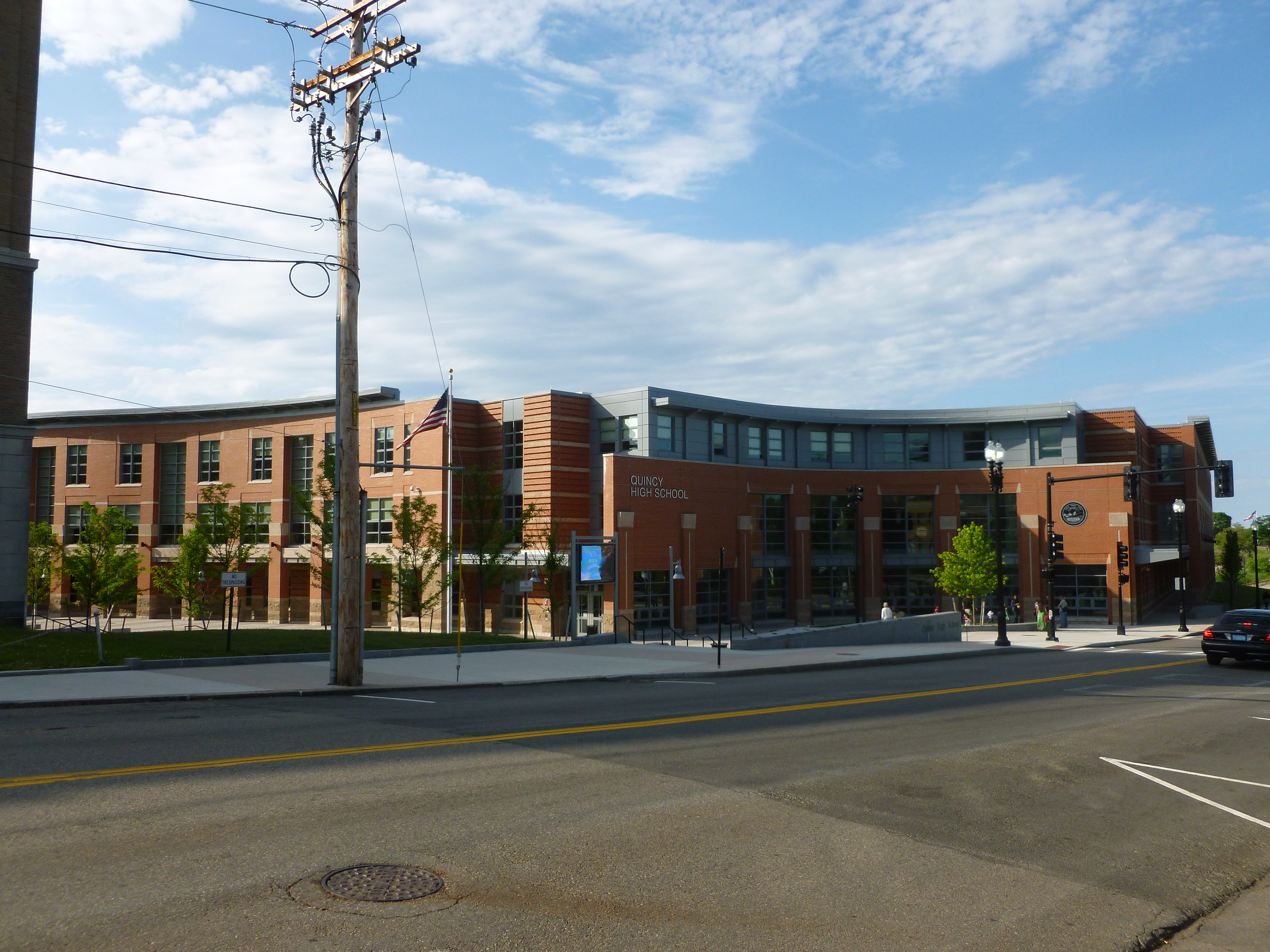
Quincy High School

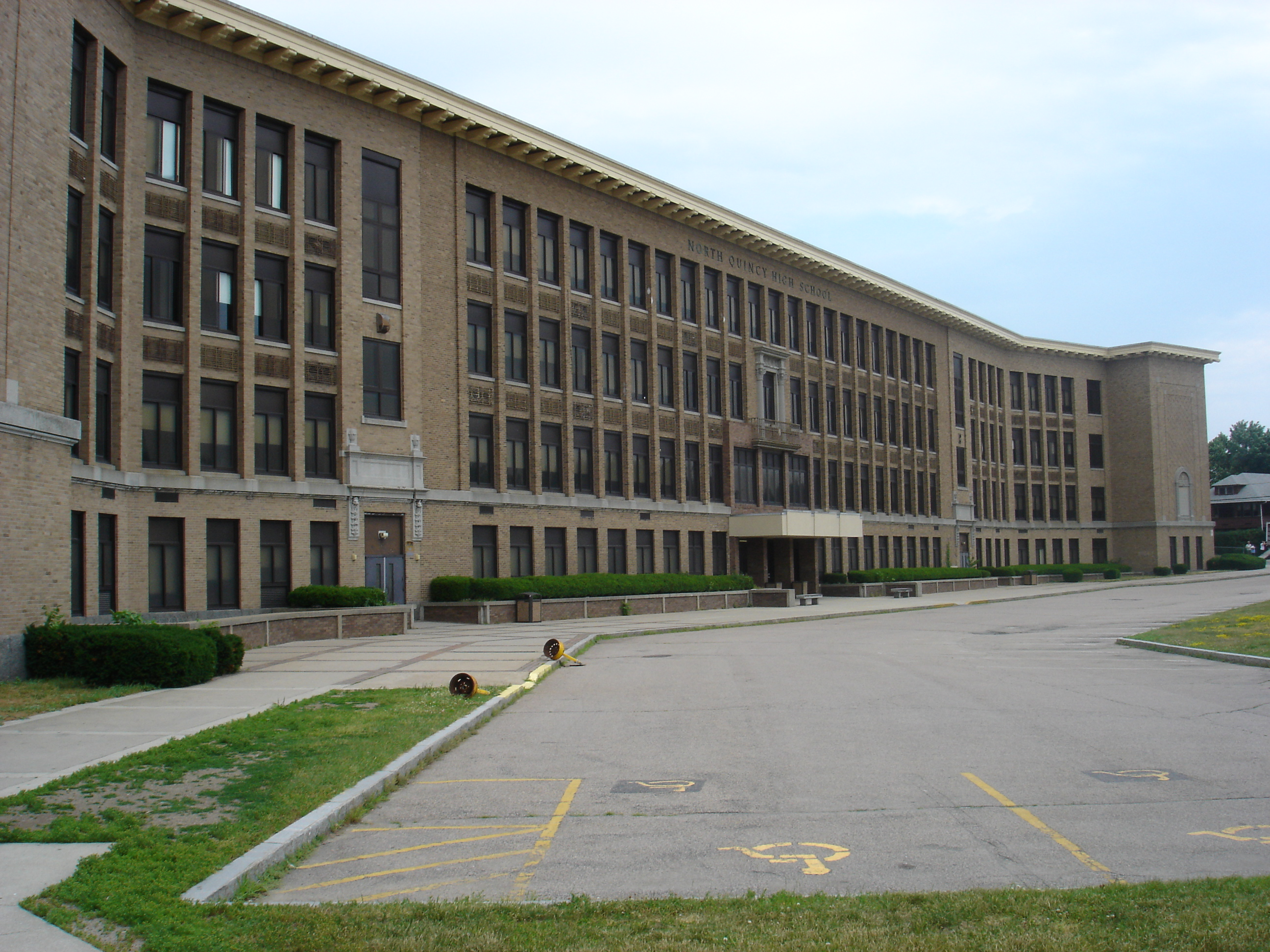
North Quincy High School

Quincy Public Schools (QPS) is a school district that manages schools in Quincy, Massachusetts, USA. The superintendent is Kevin W. Mulvey, it serves a population of approximately 94,470 of whom approximately 11% are school age.

== History ==
The Quincy Public Schools' first superintendent was Francis W. Parker. F. W. Parker Elementary School was named after him. In June 2021, Southwest Middle School was placed into a state program for schools or districts that disproportionately suspend nonwhite students or students with disabilities.

== Elementary schools ==
- Amelio Della Chiesa Early Childhood Center (preschool)
- Atherton Hough Elementary School
- Beechwood Knoll Elementary School
- Charles .A. Bernazzani Elementary School
- Lincoln-Hancock Elementary School
- Clifford Marshall Elementary School
- Merrymount Elementary School
- Montclair Elementary School
- Parker Elementary School
- Snug Harbor Elementary School (elementary and preschool)
- Squantum Elementary School
- Wollaston Elementary School

== Middle schools ==
- Atlantic Middle School
- Broad Meadows Middle School
- Central Middle School
- Point Webster Middle School
- Southwest Middle School

== High schools ==
- Quincy High School
- North Quincy High School

== Notable alumni ==
- Priscilla Chan
- Dick Dale
- John Cheever
- Ruth Gordon
- Robert Burns Woodward
