= List of mayors of Quincy, Massachusetts =

The Mayor of Quincy is the head of the municipal government in Quincy, Massachusetts.

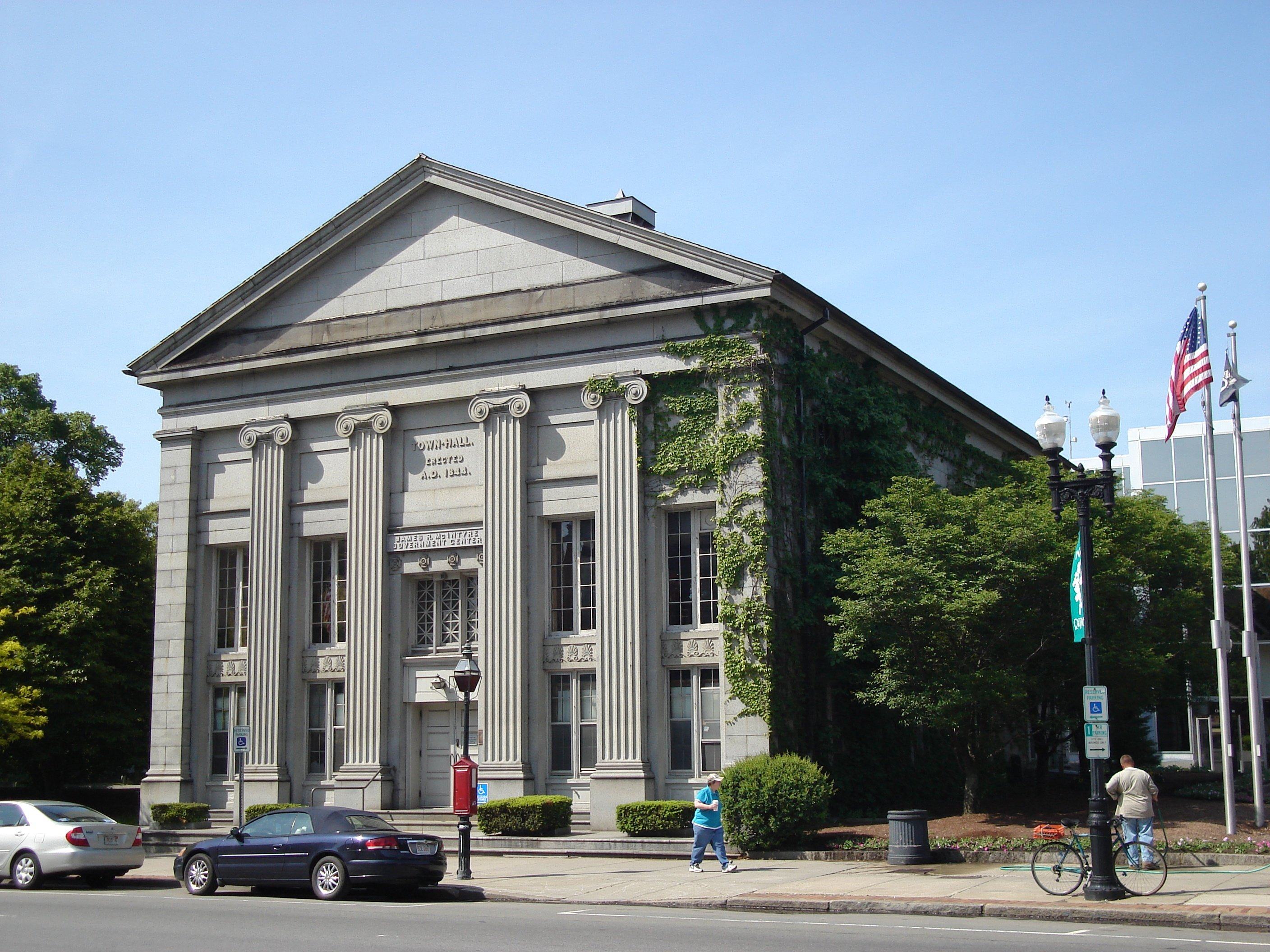
Quincy City Hall

== List of mayors ==
#	Mayor	Picture	Term	Party
1st	Charles H. Porter		1889	Republican
2nd	Henry O. Fairbanks		1890-1893	Republican
3rd	William A. Hodges		1894-1895	Democratic
4th	Charles Francis Adams		1896-1897	Independent Republican
5th	Russell Adams Sears		1898	Republican
6th	Harrison A. Keith		1899	Democratic
7th	John O. Hall		1900-1901	Republican
8th	Charles M. Bryant		1902-1904	Republican
9th	James Thompson		1905-1907	Republican
10th	William T. Shea		1908-1911	Democratic
11th	Eugene R. Stone		1912-1913	Republican
12th	John Miller		1914	Progressive
Acting	Joseph L. Whiton		1914	Progressive
13th	Chester I. Campbell		1915	Republican
14th	Gustave B. Bates		1916	Republican
15th	Joseph L. Whiton		1917–1920	Republican
16th	William A. Bradford		1921–1922	Republican
17th	Gustave B. Bates		1923–1924	Republican
18th	Perley E. Barbour		1925–1926	Republican
19th	Thomas J. McGrath		1927–1932	Republican
20th	Charles A. Ross		1933–1935	Republican
Acting	Leo E. Mullin		1935	Republican
21st	Thomas S. Burgin		1935–1942	Republican
Acting	William W. Jenness		1942	Republican
22nd	Charles A. Ross		1943–1949	Republican
23rd	Thomas S. Burgin		1950–1951	Republican
24th	David S. McIntosh		1952–1953	Republican
25th	Amelio Della Chiesa		1954–1965	Republican
26th	James McIntyre		1965–1971	Democratic
27th	Walter Hannon		1972–1975	Republican
28th	Joseph LaRala		1976–1977	Democratic
29th	Arthur Tobin		1978–1981	Democratic
30th	Francis X. McCauley		1982–1989	Republican
31st	James A. Sheets		1990–2002	Democratic (turned Independent in retirement)
32nd	William J. Phelan		2002–2008	Independent
33rd	Thomas P. Koch		2008–present	Independent
