= James McIntyre (politician) =

American politician (1930-1984)

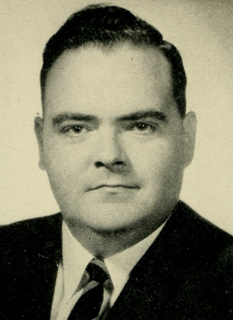

Mayor of Quincy, Massachusetts
- In office 1966–1971
- Preceded by: Amelio Della Chiesa
- Succeeded by: Walter Hannon

Member of the Massachusetts Senate from the 1st Norfolk district
- In office 1965–1971
- Preceded by: James S. McCormack
- Succeeded by: Arthur Tobin

Member of the Massachusetts House of Representatives from the 1st Norfolk district
- In office 1959–1965
- Preceded by: Carter Lee
- Succeeded by: George G. Burke

Personal details
- Born: May 25, 1930 Quincy, Massachusetts, U.S.
- Died: March 7, 1984 (aged 53) Boston, Massachusetts, U.S.
- Party: Democratic
- Education: College of the Holy Cross (BA); Harvard University (LLB); Boston University (MA)
- Occupation: Lawyer

James Richard McIntyre (May 25, 1930 – March 7, 1984) was an American attorney and politician who served as Mayor of Quincy, Massachusetts, and as a member of the Massachusetts General Court.

== Early life ==
McIntyre was born on May 25, 1930, in Quincy. He graduated from the College of the Holy Cross in Worcester, Massachusetts, with a Bachelor of Arts in 1951. He then served in the United States Marine Corps during the Korean War and was decorated for distinguished service. After the war he received a law degree from the Harvard Law School in 1956 and a master's degree in political science from Boston University in 1960.

== Political career ==
From 1956 to 1959, McIntyre was a member of the Quincy city council. During his last year on the council, he served as president. From 1959 to 1965 he was a member of the Massachusetts House of Representatives. In 1964 he was elected to the Massachusetts Senate. The following year he was elected Mayor of Quincy. He defeated his opponent by a 3 to 1 margin to become the first Democrat elected mayor of Quincy since 1911. He held both positions until 1971 when he resigned to become the Massachusetts Senate's legal counsel. McIntyre died suddenly on March 7, 1984, at Massachusetts General Hospital.

Legal offices
Preceded by Charles John Innes	Legal Counsel to the Massachusetts Senate; 1971–1984	Succeeded by George V. Kenneally Jr.
