= Russell Adams Sears =

American lawyer

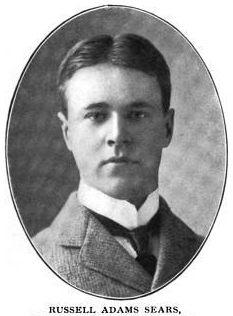

5th Mayor of Quincy, Massachusetts
- In office 1898–1898
- Preceded by: Charles Francis Adams III
- Succeeded by: Harrison A. Keith

Personal details
- Born: June 21, 1869 Brooklyn, New York
- Died: July 22, 1932 (aged 63) East Dennis, Massachusetts
- Party: Republican
- Spouse: Jennie Crocker
- Children: Percival Adams Sears
- Profession: Lawyer

Russell Adams Sears (June 21, 1869 – July 22, 1932) was the fifth mayor of Quincy, Massachusetts.

== Notes ==
Political offices
Preceded by Charles Francis Adams III	5th Mayor of Quincy, Massachusetts; 1898	Succeeded by Harrison A. Keith
