= Quincy Medical Center =

Former hospital in Quincy, Massachusetts

- Steward Health Care System

Geography
- Location: Hospital Hill, Quincy, Massachusetts, United States
- Coordinates: 42°15′04″N 71°00′47″W

Organization
- Care system: Private
- Type: Teaching
- Affiliated university: Boston University

Services
- Emergency department: Yes
- Beds: 90

History
- Former names: Quincy Hospital; Quincy City Hospital
- Opened: 1890
- Closed: December 26, 2014
- Demolished: 2021

Links
- Website: Official site
- Lists: Hospitals in Massachusetts

Quincy Medical Center was a small for-profit community hospital located in Quincy, Massachusetts for 124 years, from 1890 to 2014. A municipal hospital for most of its existence, it transitioned to non-profit in 1999 and then for-profit when it was purchased by Steward Health Care in 2011. It was closed in 2014 due to year of financial difficulties, though Steward's nearby Carney Hospital continued to operate the former hospital's ED as a stand-alone on the same site until 2020.

During its history, the hospital offered a varying range of services, including emergency care, behavioral health, obstetrics, surgery, and orthopedics.

In 2013, its final full fiscal year, Quincy Medical Center operated with total revenues of $79 million, at a loss of $19.7 million, and discharged 4,803 inpatients. In 2014, the year it closed, the hospital operated with total revenues of $68 million and losses of $39 million, and discharged 4,419 inpatients.

== History ==
Quincy Medical Center was founded in 1890 as Quincy Hospital, established to treat local granite workers suffering from dust inhalation. Initially operated as a private corporation, the city began assisting in the funding of the hospital in 1896, providing $1,000 to $5,000 per year. This ended in 1919, when the city took over the hospital following the ratification of Article CIII, an amendment to the Constitution of Massachusetts which prohibited the public funding of privately owned hospitals. Throughout most of the rest of the 20th century, the city provided millions in funding on reconstruction and improvement projects for the hospital.

In late 1999, amid mounting financial difficulties affecting hospitals across Massachusetts and a state legislature gridlocked over which hospitals should receive aid, Quincy Mayor James A. Sheets raised the possibility that the City may need to close the hospital. Sheets followed this by appealing to the legislature requesting they reconsider. Finally, in October, the legislature approved a bill which would provide a $12.1 million loan to save the hospital, with an additional $7 million to be placed in a fund for other struggling hospitals. Thanks to this loan, Quincy Hospital reopened as Quincy Medical Center, affiliating itself with Boston Medical Center.

The hospital's new affiliation with BMC made it a teaching hospital, and brought with it 25 clinical specialists to expand care at the facility as well as the appointment of BMC administrators as chiefs of medicine and surgery. However, the hospital's previous financial hardships remained, and the new board of trustees set out to strategize for the future of the hospital, which retained $60 million in debt. Before long, the city pledged $33 million over six years, and unions representing 1,100 hospital workers agreed to 10 percent cuts in compensation, which would lead to savings of $3.6 million annually.

Despite collective efforts, Quincy Medical Center's financial struggles continued. This led to a change in June 2011, when the hospital's board of trustees approved a deal that would see the hospital acquired by Steward Health Care, a for-profit Massachusetts health care system then owned by New York private equity firm Cerberus Capital Management. Four days later, the hospital filed for bankruptcy, citing $50 million in debt, inability to make monthly payments to bondholders, and the unwillingness of Steward or other potential buyers the invest enough to pay off the hospital's debts. Steward received necessary approvals from state officials, including the Public Health Council and Attorney General Martha Coakley, and the acquisition was completed September 30, 2011. Coakley's approval contained several stipulations, including that the hospital remain open for 10 years (6.5 under poor financial conditions), that 18 months notice be provided to the state if the hospital is to be closed, that Steward pay off at least $35 million of the hospital's bankruptcy debt, and that they commit to spend no less than $44 million on the needs of the hospital in the first 10 years.

Despite the agreement to keep the hospital open for 6.5–10 years, Steward announced in November 2014 that the hospital would close on December 31. This not only violated the terms of their agreement with the Coakley, but also violated state law requiring that any hospital give 90 days' notice before closing. Given declining numbers in ED visits and admissions, the hospital system came to an agreement with the state which would see the hospital remain open until February 2015, and maintain a satellite emergency department (i.e., an ED independent of an inpatient hospital) in the city until the end of that year. Ultimately due to low inpatient volume, the hospital was given a waiver allowing them to close inpatient operations on December 26, 2014.

Following the closure of the main hospital, the emergency department at Quincy Medical Center was kept open as a "satellite" facility, operated under the license of Steward's nearby Carney Hospital.

In 2016, Steward sold the hospital's property to developer FoxRock Properties in a temporary sale-leaseback deal which would allow them to continue running the satellite ED. The lease arrangement, originally written to terminate in 2021, lasted until 2020 when FoxRock utilized a clause allowing for early termination. Steward reported that they had attempted to find adequate space elsewhere in the city to move the ED, but were unable to find a landlord willing to host it. While city officials criticized Steward for closing the hospital and for their failure to open another ED in the city, they conceded that "we know the marketplace will not sustain a hospital in that location or in the city."

Demolition of the hospital campus was completed by FoxRock in 2021 to make way for residential development. The only building left standing was the hospital's administrative building, which would be restored and remain as part of the development.

== Legacy ==
Quincy Medical Center grew with and helped shape the City of Quincy through the end of the 19th century and the whole of the 20th. Its establishment as a center of care for granite workers was representative of Quincy's overall history as a prominent exporter of granite. The surrounding neighborhood gained its current name, Hospital Hill, due to the prominence of the hospital, and generations of Quincy residents were born, cared for, and died at the hospital.

However, the hospital faced financial difficulty throughout its existence, escalating in the late 20th century and culminating with its closure in the new millennium - leaving Quincy as the largest city in Massachusetts without an acute care hospital or emergency department. In its later years, the saturation of the health care market took its toll on Quincy Medical Center. While it provided convenience to residents of Quincy, the hospital's deteriorating relationships with other providers left more preferable options for a wider range of care, and the presence of nearby regional competitors like South Shore Hospital in Weymouth, Beth Israel Deaconess Medical Center's campus in Milton, and numerous hospitals in Boston offered more convenience and higher level of care for those not within city limits. These factors were commonly blamed for the inability of the hospital to become financially viable.
