= Wellingsley, Massachusetts =

Coordinates: 41°56′45″N 70°38′48″W

Wellingsley, also known as Wellingsly, Jabez Corner, and Hobs Hole, is a neighborhood in Plymouth, Massachusetts, United States. It is notable for being the oldest separate neighborhood in the town. Wellingsley is located one mile south of Plymouth Center and north of Chiltonville. The neighborhood is interchangeably called Hobs Hole and Jabez Corner by its residents. Hobs Hole is a small brook that runs along Nook Road and empties into Plymouth Harbor. The name Hob's Hole supposedly derives from "Hobbamock's Hole", referencing a natural harbour ascribed to a famous pniese Pokanoket living with the pilgrims. Jabez Corner, at the intersection of Sandwich Street and Warren Avenue, which Route 3A passes through, is a location containing several small stores.
