= Wessagusset Colony =

- Colony of England
- Approximate location of the Wessagusset Colony in Massachusetts
- Coordinates: 42.220833°N 70.940278°W
- Country: United States
- State: Massachusetts
- Established: 1622

Population (1623)
  - Total: Approximately 60

Wessagusset Colony (sometimes called the Weston Colony or Weymouth Colony) was a short-lived English trading colony in New England located in Weymouth, Massachusetts. It was settled in August 1622 by between 50 and 60 colonists who were ill-prepared for colonial life. The colony was settled without adequate provisions, and was dissolved in late March 1623 after harming relations with local Indians. Surviving colonists joined Plymouth Colony or returned to England. It was the second settlement in Massachusetts, predating the Massachusetts Bay Colony by six years.

Historian Charles Francis Adams Jr. referred to the colony as "ill-conceived, ill-executed, ill-fated". It is best remembered for the battle in late March 1623 between Plymouth troops led by Myles Standish and an Indian force led by Pecksuot. This battle scarred relations between the Plymouth colonists and the Indians, and it was fictionalized two centuries later in Henry Wadsworth Longfellow's 1858 poem The Courtship of Miles Standish.

In September 1623, a second colony was created on the abandoned site at Wessagusset led by Governor-General Robert Gorges. This colony was rechristened as Weymouth and was also unsuccessful, and Governor Gorges returned to England the following year. Despite that, some settlers remained in the village and it was absorbed into the Massachusetts Bay Colony in 1630.

== Origin ==
The colony was coordinated by Thomas Weston, a London merchant and ironmonger. He was associated with the Plymouth Council for New England which had funded the short-lived Popham Colony in Maine 15 years earlier. During the period when the Pilgrims were in the Netherlands, Weston helped to arrange their passage to the New World with help from the Merchant Adventurers. Historian Charles Francis Adams, Jr. glowingly called him a "sixteenth century adventurer" in the mold of John Smith and Walter Raleigh, adding that his "brain teemed with schemes for deriving sudden gain from the settlement of the new continent". In later years, Plymouth Governor William Bradford called him "a bitter enemy unto Plymouth upon all occasions".

Turning a profit was the primary purpose of Weston's new colony, rather than the religious reasons of the Pilgrims who established Plymouth, and this dictated how the colony would be assembled. Weston believed that families were a detriment to a well-run plantation, so he selected able-bodied men only—but not men experienced in colonial life. In total, there were several advance scouts and 50 or 60 other colonists. The final complement also included one surgeon and one lawyer. The party was outfitted with enough supplies to last the winter.

== First Wessagusset colony ==
An advance team of 60 settlers arrived at the Plymouth Colony in May 1622 aboard the Sparrow, an English fishing vessel which was sailing to the coast of Maine. The team traveled the final 150 miles (240 km) down the New England coast in a shallop with three members of the Sparrow's crew. These colonists stayed only briefly in Plymouth before scouting the coast in their shallop to find a site for their colony. After finding one, they negotiated for the land with Chief Aberdecest and returned to Plymouth, sending the shallop back to the Sparrow and awaiting the remainder of the colonists.

The main body of colonists set off from London in April 1622 aboard the Charity and the Swan. Richard Greene, Thomas Weston's brother-in-law, was the initial leader of the group. They arrived in Plymouth in late June and moved into their settlement the following month. By the end of September, the colony was established, the Swan was moored in Weymouth Fore River, and the Charity returned to England.

Relations were initially cordial between the two colonies, and the men of the Wessagusset assisted Plymouth with their harvest, but the people of Plymouth accused them of stealing. Indians soon complained to Plymouth that the Wessagusset colonists were stealing their corn, but Plymouth had no authority over the new colony and could only send them a "rebuke". Wessagusset was consuming food too quickly because of the disorder of the colony, as reported by Plymouth's Governor Bradford, and it became apparent that they would run out before the end of the winter. In addition, Plymouth was also low on supplies due to spending additional time during the growing season building fortifications rather than growing crops. To prevent hunger for both colonies, Plymouth and Wessagusset colonists organized a joint trading mission to the Indians with goods brought by the Wessagusset colonists. That trading mission was somewhat successful and the two colonies split the proceeds. In November, Greene died and John Sanders was made governor of the colony. By January, the colonists continued to trade with the Indians for food, but at a severe disadvantage. This drove up the barter-price of corn and they were forced to trade their clothes and other needed supplies. Some colonists entered a form of servitude, building canoes and performing other labors for the Indians in exchange for food, and ten colonists died. The Indians caught one Wessagusset man stealing, so the other Wessagusset colonists hanged him in their view as a show of good faith. However, sources disagree whether the man hanged was the culprit or an older, possibly dying man. The legend that the Wessagusset colonists hanged an innocent man was later popularized by a satirical depiction of this event in Samuel Butler's 1660s poem Hudibras. In February, Sanders petitioned Plymouth for a joint attack on the Indians, but Governor Bradford refused. Much of the story of the first Wessagusset colony is detailed in a 1662 account by company member Phineas Pratt.

=== Killings at Wessagusset ===
Miles Standish, circa 1630

Tensions continued to build throughout the winter between the settlers and the Indians, and there was at least one instance where an Indian was caught stealing from Plymouth. Near the end of the winter, the Indians near Wessagusset moved some of their huts to a swamp near the colony, and the colonists felt that they were under siege.

One colonist at Wessagusset saw these signs and other indications of hostility, and fled to Plymouth to bring word of an imminent attack, pursued by Indians during his flight. He arrived at Plymouth on March 24 and met with Governor Bradford and town councilmen. It is unclear whether this colonist's report was the tipping point or whether Plymouth had already decided to mount a pre-emptive attack. Edward Winslow had saved the life of Wampanoag chief Massasoit, and Massasoit now warned him of a conspiracy among several tribes against Wessagusset and Plymouth. The threatening tribes were led by the Massachusetts but also included the Nauset, Paomet, Succonet, Mattachiest, Capawack, and Agawam tribes from as far away as Martha's Vineyard. Plymouth colony sent a small force under Miles Standish to Wessagusset, and they arrived on March 26.

Standish called all of the Wessagusset colonists into the stockade for defense. The following day, several Indians were at Wessagusset, including chief Pecksuot. Historical sources give different accounts of the killings, but four of the Indians were in the same room as Standish and several of his men. One source from the 1880s suggests that it was the Indians who arranged to be alone with Standish in order to attack him. Other modern sources claim that Standish had invited them into the situation on peaceful pretenses. Regardless, Standish gave the order to strike, quickly killing Chief Pecksuot with his own knife. Several other Indians in the village were attacked next, and only one escaped to raise the alarm. As many as five colonists were also killed in the brief battle; one Indian's head was cut off and displayed in Plymouth as a warning to others, which was a common practice in Europe at the time.

In 1858, Henry Wadsworth Longfellow included a fictionalized depiction of the killings in his poem The Courtship of Miles Standish. In his version, the Indians are depicted as begging for weapons to use against other tribes, and Standish responds by offering them Bibles. The Indians begin to boast and taunt him, so Standish attacks first:

But when he heard their defiance, the boast, the taunt, and the insult,
the hot blood of his race, of Sir Hugh and of Thurston de Standish,
Boiled and beat in his heart, and swelled in the veins of his temples.
Headlong he leaped on the boaster, and, snatching his knife from its scabbard,
Plunged it into his heart, and, reeling backward, the savage
Fell with his face to the sky, and a fiendlike fierceness upon it.

— Henry Wadsworth Longfellow, The Courtship of Miles Standish.

=== Aftermath ===
Following the brief conflict, Standish offered to leave several soldiers to defend the colony, but the colonists declined. Instead, they divided, some returning to England in the Swan, including John Sanders, others remaining behind to join the Plymouth colony. By spring of 1623, the village was empty and the colony was dissolved. Thomas Weston arrived in Maine several months later, seeking to join his colony, only to discover that it was already failed. Some of his former settlers apparently had gone north to Maine and were living on House Island in Casco Bay in a home built by explorer Capt. Christopher Levett, who had been granted land to found an English colony. Levett's settlement also failed, and the fate of Weston's men is uncertain.

Due to the fighting at Wessagusset, Plymouth's trade with the Indians was devastated for years. Local tribes which had previously been favorable to Plymouth began to forge bonds with other tribes in defense against the colonists. Historians differ on whether the conflict could have been avoided or the colony saved. Some historians see the preemptive strike as a necessary one, "saving the lives of hundreds", while others see it as a sad misunderstanding. Historian Charles Francis Adams summarizes the Wessagusset experience as "ill-conceived, ill-executed, ill-fated".

== Second Wessagusset colony ==
The Plymouth Council for New England gave Robert Gorges a patent for a settlement covering 300 square miles (780 km^{2}) northeast of Boston Harbor. He was an English captain and son of Sir Ferdinando Gorges. This settlement was intended to be a spiritual and civic capital of the council's New England colonies. Gorges was commissioned as Governor-General with authority over Plymouth and presumably future colonies. His government was also to consist of a leadership council, of which Plymouth's Governor Bradford would be a member. Weston had brought only working men, whereas Gorges brought entire families who would form a permanent settlement. He also brought two Anglican clergymen who would oversee the spiritual health of the region.

Gorges arrived in Massachusetts in September 1623, only four months after Weston's colony collapsed. Instead of founding his colony at the location described in the patent, he chose the abandoned settlement at Wessagusset. It was rechristened Weymouth after Weymouth, Dorset, the town where the expedition began. Over the following weeks, he visited Plymouth and ordered the arrest of Thomas Weston who had arrived in that colony in the Swan. This was his only official act as Governor-General. Weston was charged with neglect of his colony and with selling weapons to the Indians which were supposed to have been used for the defense of the colony. Weston denied the first charge but confessed to the second. After consideration, Gorges released him on his word, and he eventually settled as a politician in Virginia and Maryland.

After a winter in Weymouth, Gorges abandoned his new colony in the spring of 1624 due to financial difficulties. Most of his settlers returned to England, but some remained as colonists in Weymouth, Plymouth, or Virginia, and William Blaxton settled in Boston. The remaining Weymouth settlers were supported by Plymouth until they were made part of the Massachusetts Bay Colony in 1630. Massachusetts Bay Governor John Winthrop visited the settlement in 1632. In time, the location of the original settlement was lost to history and development. The location of the original fort was not rediscovered until 1891.
