= Phineas Pratt =

English joiner and early colonist in New England (d. 1680)

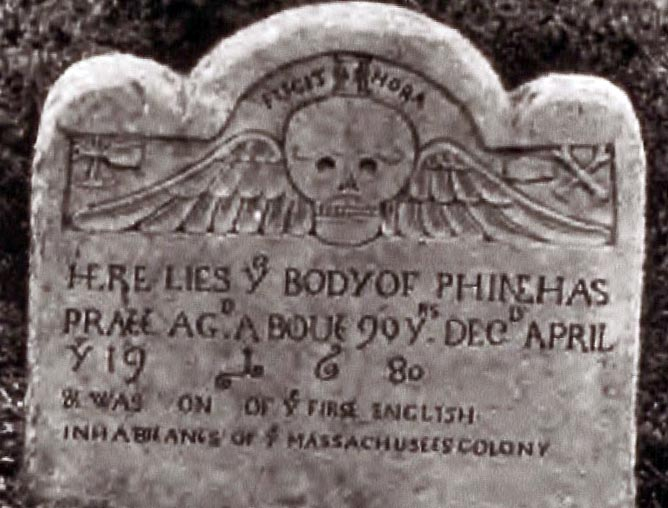
Phineas Pratt's grave in Charlestown, Massachusetts

Phineas Pratt (c.1593 – April 19, 1680) (a.k.a. Phineaus Pratt or Phinehas Pratt), a joiner from London, was one of the first English settlers in New England and enrolled among the "First Comers" of Plymouth Colony. Pratt arrived as part of the company of Thomas Weston on the 1622 voyage of the ship Sparrow and was among the founders of the Wessagusset (Weymouth) settlement which failed in March 1623. In 1623, when it still numbered about 32 dwellings, Pratt joined the Plymouth Colony and later married Mary Priest, the daughter of Mayflower passenger Degory Priest. In 1662, he wrote an account of the early days of the Wessagusett colony as part of a petition to the General Court of Massachusetts for "First Comer" status, which he was granted.

== English origins ==
Phineas Pratt was born in London, Middlesex, England around 1593. He was the son of the Reverend Henry Pratt and his wife Mary. Henry Pratt was a Puritan Nonconformist minister who was imprisoned in England for preaching the gospel contrary to the rule of the Church of England. Family legend has it that Henry communicated with his family by writing letters penned in his own blood.

According to the book Phinehas Pratt and Some of His Descendants, written by Eleazer Franklin Pratt and published posthumously in 1897: "Tradition relates that the father of Henry was John, and that either John or the father of John, was a Frenchman who bore the surname of Plat or Platt; having fled from France during some political excitement in that country, he became and "Armor-bearer" to the Monarch of England, and his name was subsequently changed to Pratt." However, according to more recent genealogists, his grandfather—John Henry Pratt—may have in fact been from Bishopworth, Somerset, England.

== Career ==
Phineas Pratt was by profession a joiner, or carpenter.

=== The ill-fated Wessagusset settlement ===
Some time prior to 1622, at around the age of 29, Phineas Pratt and his brother Joshua Pratt joined the company of Thomas Weston, a London Merchant involved with the Leiden Separatists and Pilgrims who settled Plymouth Colony in 1620. Known to the Pilgrims as the "Strangers", this group of adventurers arrived in New England in 1622 on three ships: the Sparrow, Charity and Swan. Phineas Pratt was a passenger on the Sparrow, which was the first ship of the three to arrive. Poorly supplied, with inferior provisions and with many ill, Weston's total company comprised approximately 67 men, about ten of whom sailed on the Sparrow and (through some mis-navigation) put ashore in Damarill's Cove (Damariscove Islands), off the now State of Maine, to find a site for another plantation. Encountering some Native Americans, Weston's men thought it best to settle closer to the Plimoth plantation. Weston sent Pratt with a group of about seven men to scout out the area around Plymouth. Encountering the settlers there, who were in need of provisions, they brought some back to the Maine encampment to give them some supplies. Eventually, the group sailed to Plymouth to await the arrival of the Charity and Swan, and the Pilgrims supported them throughout the summer of 1622. In August, after the arrival of the Swan, the merchant's company built a trading post stockade in the abandoned native settlement of Wessaguscus, now Weymouth, Massachusetts, under the leadership of Weston's brother-in-law: Richard Greene.

=== Pratt's journey through the snow ===
According to the Pilgrim Hall Museum, the settlement at Wessagusset was problematic from the start. Greene soon died during a visit to Plymouth and was replaced by John Sanders. "They soon fell into difficulties through behaving, generally, in a very foolish and improvident fashion. They also severely angered the local Native Americans by stealing their corn."

In his memoir of travels to the colony, Christopher Levett complains of company members, "They neither applied themselves to planting of corn, nor taking of fish, more than their present use, but went about to build castles in the aire, and making of forts, neglecting the plentiful time of fishing; when winter came, their forts would not keep out hunger, and they having no provision beforehand, and wanting both powder and shot to kill deer and fowl, many starved to death and the rest hardly escaped." (In their defense, Eleazer Pratt mentions that the company had settled their colony too late to plant food for the winter.)

Members of the company stole both from the natives led by Pecksuot and from their own countrymen in Plimoth. According to Eleazer Pratt's narrative, "The half-starved company of Weston had some among their number who could not resist the temptation of stealing and eating the inviting grain. The Plymouth people detected some of them trespassing thus, and had them severely whipped, for what an old chronicler termed 'a few caps of corn'."

According to Pratt's own narrative:

Some time after this their Sachem came suddenly upon us with a great number of armed men; but their spies seeing us in readiness, he & some of his chief men turned into one of their houses a quarter of an hour. Then we met them outside the pale of our plantation & brought them it. Then said I to a young man that could best speak their language, "Ask Pecksuot why they come thus armed.‟ He answered, "Our Sachem is angry with you.‟ I said, "Tell him if he be angry with us, we be angry with him.‟ Then said their Sachem, "English men, when you came into the country, we gave you gifts and you gave us gifts; we bought and sold with you and we were friends; and now tell me if I or any of my men have done you wrong.‟ We answered, "First tell us if we have done you any wrong.‟ He answered, "Some of you steal our corn & I have sent you word times without number & yet our corn is stolen. I come to see what you will do.‟ We answered, "It is one man which has done it. Your men have seen us whip him divers time, besides other manner of punishments, & now hear he is, bound. We give him unto you to do with him what you please.‟ He answered, "That is not just dealing. If my men wrong my neighbor Sachem or his men, he sends me word & I beat or kill my men, according to the offense. If his men wrong me or my men, I send him word & he beats or kills his men according to the offense. All Sachems do justice by their own men. If not, we say they are all agreed & then we fight, & now I say you all steal my corn.

The company did not turn over the man. Shortly thereafter, in March 1623, Massasoit, who was then sachem of the Wampanoags, informed the Plymouth colonists that there was a conspiracy among the natives of the Wessagusset area to massacre the Weston men. Just as Myles Standish was about to set out to rescue Weston's men on March 24, Phineas Pratt arrived in Plymouth "from the Massachusetts with a small pack at his back."

According to Pratt's own narrative, he had become uneasy and told his company that someone needed to warn the Plimoth settlement, lest they all be slain. No one else was willing to accompany him. Believing the natives were simply waiting for the snow to melt, Pratt pretended to go out gathering nuts and instead set out walking 25 miles in the snow, journeying for several days without food. Pratt famously walked backward through the snow on part of this journey, hoping to deceive anyone following him into thinking he journeyed in the opposite direction.

Standish and his men journeyed to Wessagusett to protect the company there, killing several of the chiefs (Pecksuoth and another sachem called Wittawaumet) in the process of the journey. Pratt did not accompany them, as he was "faint". Instead he "asked that hee might there remaine until things were settled at the other plantation."

When he was able, Pratt rejoined his company at Piscataqua, but soon thereafter Weston's group abandoned the stockade at Wessagusset. Pratt was involved in recorded conflicts with natives of Massachusetts in Wessgusett, Agawam (Ipswich) and Dorchester. According to Pratt, nine of the Wessagusett company died of famine, two were slain by natives of the area, and one died on his way to the fishing ships after the colony abandoned the town.

=== Settlement in Plymouth ===
Sometime in late 1623, Weston ended his venture. Most of the remaining company returned home. Phineas Pratt and others joined the Plymouth settlement, where they were received with mixed feelings, and later listed as if they were passengers of the Anne. According to John Winslow, "I would not be understood to think there were no well-deserving persons among them".

Pratt was included in a division of land in Plymouth in 1623, where he and Joshua Pratt were assigned, jointly, two acres of land. In 1624 when Plymouth was divided into twelve companies, Phineas and Joshua were assigned to Francis Cooke. At this time Plymouth comprised about 32 dwellings and was one half mile large.

== Marriage and later life ==
In 1630, Phineas Pratt married Mary Priest, daughter of Degory Priest and his wife Sarah (Allerton) Vincent. Mary was born in England around 1612. Degory Priest had left his wife and daughters Mary and Sarah behind in Leiden, intending to return for them, but died during the difficult first winter of the settlement. His widow married again in Holland (her third marriage) to Cuthbert Cuthbertson (aka Godbert Godbertson), and arrived with her daughters and baby son on the ship Anne, in 1623.

Upon marrying Mary Priest (aka Marah Godbertson), Phineas became possessed of thirty acres of land on the high cliff, and they purchased thirty more at Winslow Stand near Phineas' land.

On August 6, 1646, Phineas sold his estate in Plymouth to John Cooke and around May 20, 1648, Pratt purchased a house and garden in Charlestown, Massachusetts, purchased from George Bunker, somewhere between the "windmill hill and that way which goes into Elbow Lane."

=== 1662 and 1668 petitions to the General Court ===
In 1662, at the age of about 69, Pratt presented to the General Court of Massachusetts a request for financial assistance and to establish his status as a "First Comer" entitled to the benefits the earliest settlers of Massachusetts were afforded by law. To support this claim, Pratt submitted an extraordinary narrative of his early days in the settlement titled A declaration of the affaires of the Einglish People, that first inhabited New Eingland.

In response, the court granted him three hundred acres of land "laid out in the wilderness on the east of the Merrimack River, near the upper end of the 'Nacoke Brooke'." (This was in Dunstable, near present-day Litchfield, New Hampshire, though the value would not be able to be realized on this wild land for decades to come.)

In October 1668, at age around 75, Pratt again petitioned the Court:

To the Honoured the Generall Court, holden at Boston this— October 1668

I acknowledg myself truly thankfull unto the Honoured Court for that they gave me at the time I presented an History called, A declaration of the affaires of the Einglish People, that first inhabited New Eingland. Yet my necessity causeth me farther to entreat you to consider what my service hath been unto my dread Soveraign Lord King James of famous memory. I am one of that litle number, ten men that arrived in the Massachusetts Bay for the setling of a Plantation, & am the remainder of the forlorn hope sixty men. We bought the south part of the Bay of Aberdecest their Sachem. Ten of our company died by famine. Then said ye Natives of the Countrey, "Let us kill them whist they are weak, or they will possesse our Countrey & drive us away." Three times we fought with them, thirty miles I was pursued for my life, in times of frost, and snow, as a deer chased with wolves. Two of our men were kill'd in warr, one shot in the shoulder. It was not by the wit of man nor by ye strength of the arme of flesh, that we prevailed against them. But God, that overrules all power, put fear in their hearts. And now, seeing God hath added a New England to Old Engl. and given both to our dread Soverig Lord King Charles the second, many thousand People enjoy the peace thereof; Now in times of prosperity, I beseech you consider the day of small things; for I was almost frozen in time of our weak beginnings, and now I am lame.

My humble request is for that may be for my subsistaunce, the remaining time of my life.

Pratt's 1668 request was not granted.

== Death and burial ==
On April 19, 1680, Phineas Pratt died in Charlestown, Massachusetts. According to his gravestone, he was "about 90 years".

The will of Phineas Pratt dates January 8, 1677. According to the records of the Pilgrim Hall Museum, the text is as follows:

I, Phinias Pratt of Charlstown in the Countie of Midellsex Joyner being very aged and Crazye of body yett in my pfect memory and understanding doe make This my last will and Teastamoen. Item I give unto my belovid wife Mary Pratt all my movabl goods and fortie Shillings a year to be payed oute of my land in Charlstowne and the use of the gardon for term of hir life: this fortie Shillings is to be payed by my sonn Joseph Pratt for and in consideration of the having of my land and my wif is to have a convenient room of my sonn Joseph with a chimny in it to hir content to lie in for term of hir life. Wthout molestation or trubl; but If my sonn Joseph doeth not perform this will that then my wif Mary Prat shall have the one half of the land to hir Dispossing for his vest comfort: it is to be understod that the one half wch the new hous standeth one is given to Joseph upon the condistion of providing of a convenient room for me and my wife for term of our lives and this other half for the paying of the fortie Shillings a year paying it quartterly that is to say ten shllig a quarter in mony and fier wood at mony price and If ther be any thing left at the death of my wife it shalbe equally devided a mung all my children. this eight of Jeneary 1677 Phinehas Pratt Sealed and deliverd in the presents of Use Walter alen, the marke of Rebeack Alen

The total value of all Pratt's goods was 32 pounds, 16 shillings, 06 pence. His heirs were given as: John (deceased), Peter (deceased), Samuel, Daniel, and Mary (his other three living children, Mercy, Aaron and Joseph, having disposed of their shares).
