= Hobbamock =

Pokanoket pniese who came to live with the Plymouth Colony settlers

Hobbamock was a Pokanoket pniese who came to live with the Plymouth Colony settlers during the first year of their settlement in North America in 1620. His name was variously spelled in 17th century documents and today is generally simplified as Hobomok. He is known for his rivalry with Squanto, who lived with the settlers before him. He was greatly trusted by Myles Standish, the colony's military commander, and he joined with Standish in a military raid against the Massachuset. Hobomock was also greatly devoted to Massasoit, the sachem of the Pokanoket, who befriended the English settlers. Hobomok is often claimed to have been converted to Christianity, but what that meant to him is unclear.

== Life among the Pokanoket ==
Almost nothing is known about Hobomok before he began living with the English settlers who arrived aboard the Mayflower and settled at the location they called Plymouth in December 1620. That information is contained in the writings of Governor William Bradford and Edward Winslow (who would later become governor of the colony).

Hobomok was a member of the Pokanoket whose sachem Massasoit presided over a confederation of numerous smaller bands, villages and associations, which was named by the English the Wampanoag Confederation. The Pokanoket were a group of Algonquian peoples who lived in Southern New England with their principal village, Pokanoket, later called Sowams, located near what is now Bristol, Rhode Island. Like the other Algonquins from the area from south of the Saco river in Maine to around what is now the border between Connecticut and Rhode Island, the Pokanoket were organized under the leadership of a sachem, selected by the leading men from among a group within prescribed degrees of kinship to the previous sachem. At the time the Mayflower arrived the sachem was Massasoit. Beneath the sachem was a class of "principal men" (called ahtaskoaog in Algonquinian) which consisted of shamans (called pau waus or "pow-wows" or "powahs" by the English), who mediated between the people and the god of healing (Abbomocho, called "Hobbomock" or "Hobbamoqui" by the English) and the pniesesock, who were both advisors and administrative delegates of the sachem, who collected the annual tribute to the sachem, led warriors into battle and advised on the distribution or sale of land. Hobomok was a Pokanoket pniese.

== Life among the Plymouth settlers ==
=== Pokanoket establish relations with Pilgrims ===
On Friday, March 16, 1620/21 o.s. Samoset, an Abenaki sachem from the coast region of Maine near the mouth of the Pemaquid River "bodly came" into the Plymouth settlement and greeted the startled men in English. He explained he was acting on behalf the Pokanoket, who were their neighbors to the west. Through his and later Squanto's mediation, Massasoit with his brother Quadrquina and a train of 60 men arrive outside the settlement on Thursday, March 22 o.s. It was during this encounter that the English settlers and the Pokanoket entered into a peace and mutual defense treaty. Hobomok is not noted to be among the 60 men accompanying Massasoit, but as a pniese it is more than likely that he was.

=== Hobomok comes to live with English ===
It was not until four or five months later that Hobomok's activities are recorded by the settlers, although Bradford makes clear that he had been living with them for a while, but how long he does not say. Bradford described him as "a proper lustie man, and a man of accounte for his vallour and parts amongst thed Indeans." Squanto had been living among the English settlers since the establishment of amity between the English and the Pokanoket, and during that time had shown the settlers how to plant maize and other native crops, had acted as their guide and pilot to surrounding areas, facilitated understandings between the colony and its native neighbors and established trade relations with a number of villages. Both Bradford and Winslow first record Hobomock's actions in connection with a crisis in which Squanto was thought to have been kidnapped and possibly murdered. Bradford's and Winslow's accounts differ in important details, however.

=== Action to rescue Squanto from Corbitant ===
As Winslow told the story, word reached Plymouth that the Narragansett had driven Massasoit "from his country" and that a sub-sachem, tributary to Massasoit named Corbitant (written Coubatant by Winslow) (possibly conspiring with them) was at the nearby village of Nemasket attempting to disaffect the people their from their loyalty to Masassoit and attempting to foment hostility against the English and because of the recent peace treaty they made with the natives of Cape Cod, Squanto also because he effected the treaty. Another Pokanet living among them, Tokamaham, set off to see Massasoit (or perhaps Corbitant, Winslow's account is not clear) but Squanto and Hobomok were afraid. Instead, they went to Nemasket to learn what they could about Corbitant's activities. When there Squanto was captured by Corbitant of whom Corbitant said "if he were dead, the English had lost their tongue." Hobomok saw Corbitant holding a knife to Squanto's chest, broke free of his restraints and ran to Plymouth, fearing that Squanto had been killed. Bradford's account makes no mention of any threat to Massasoit> He only writes that Hobomok and Squanto returning from "bussines amonge the Indeans" met Corbitant at Nemasket where they began quarreling and Corbitant threatened to stab Hobomok, broke free and came running to Plymouth where he told Bradford that he feared Squanto had been killed, all on account of their friendship to the English. The Governor convened a council at which it was decided that this outrage could not go unavenged. They determined to send a group of armed men to Nemasket and if it turned out that Squanto had been killed, they would cut off Corbitant's head.

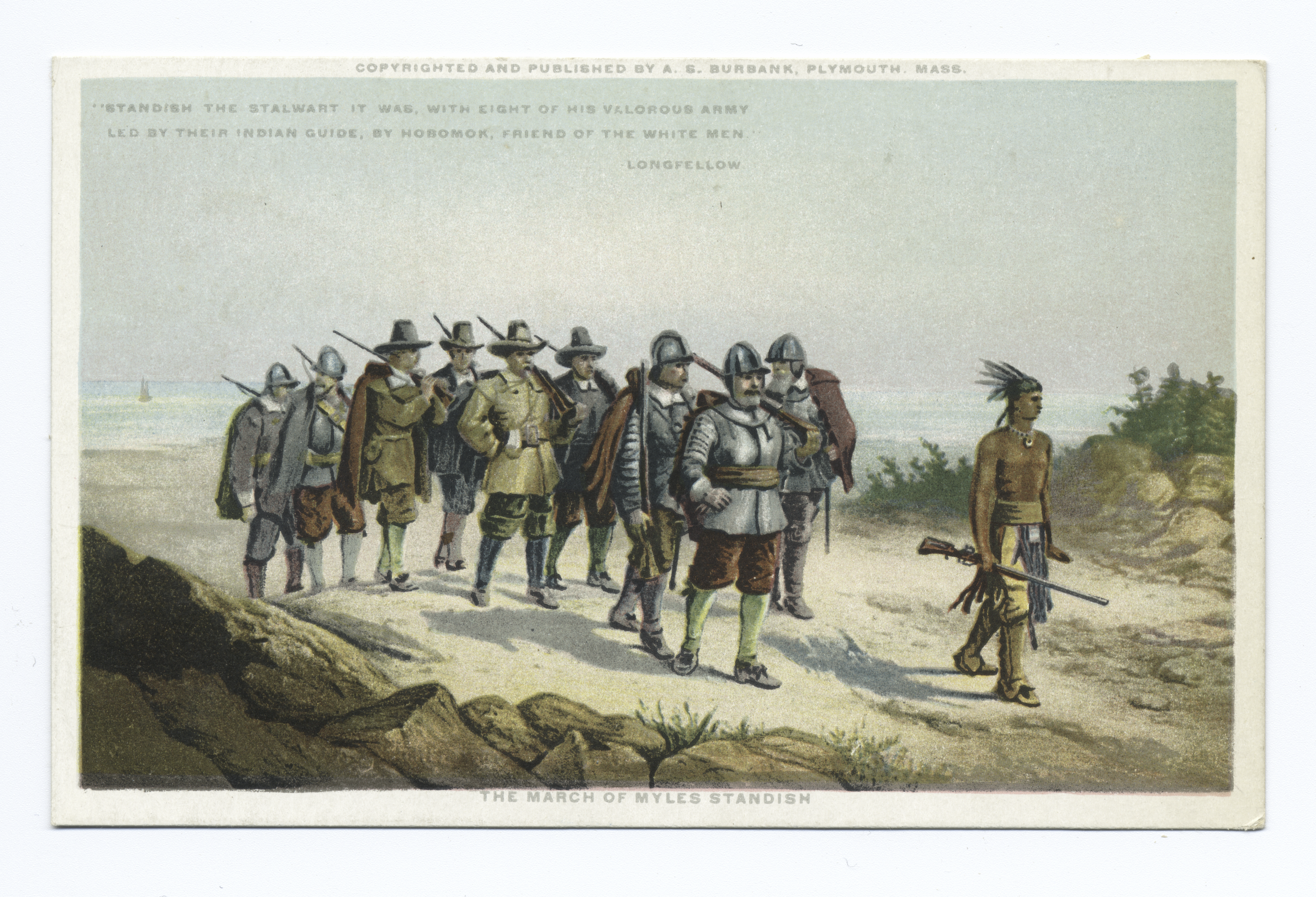
The March of Myles Standish, ". . . with Eight of his Valorous Army Led by Their Indian Guide, By Hobomok . . ." Longfellow

Bradford commissioned a group of armed men (Bradford says 14) under Captain Standish on a mission to raid Nemasket at night to round up Corbitant and any accomplices. The men set out on August 14, and Hobomok agreed to show them the route. The day proved very wet, but they marched within two or three miles of Nemasket and hoped to rest before their midnight attack. Hobomok, however, lost his way in the night, which, together with the rain and fatigue, greatly discouraged the men. Fortunately, Winslow and Stephen Hopkins had been to Nemasket recently on their way to an embassy to Massasoit in Pokanoket. Though discouraged and wet, they arrived in time to eat what they brought, then fell on the town around midnight.

Hobomok led them to the house where he suspected Corbitant would be found. The men burst into the house demanding to know where Corbitant was, but the occupants were too terrified to speak. They tried to explain that they were only looking for Corbitant and women and children would not be hurt, but several tried to escape and were wounded in the process. The settlers discharged their muskets at least twice "at random" which excited the entire village. Eventually, those in the house explained (to Hobomok) that Crobitant and his train had left. The settlers demanded a fire be built to search the corners of the house and commandeered it to stay the night. Hobomok mounted the roof and called for Squanto, who came together with Tokamahamon and others, who were disarmed by the settlers. The next morning the settlers gathered the village and warned them not to harbor Corbitant and threatened that if Massasoit did not return in safety or if Corbitant threatened or harmed him or his subjects (including Squanto and Hobomok), they would enact vengeance. They also apologized for the injuries they committed the previous night and offered to have those wounded be treated by the surgeon at Plymouth. Winslow said that a man and a woman returned with them to be treated, as well as Squanto and Nemasket villagers "offering all helpe that might be by carriage of anything wee had to ease us."

=== Hostility of the Massachuset ===
Hobomok is next mentioned seven months later, in March 1621/22. Plymouth found itself in a precarious situation since the previous November when the Fortune brought an additional 35 settlers without any provisions. This required the colony to go on half rations throughout the winter. The Narragansett soon learned of the weakened condition of the settlement and "began to break forth many threats against us," so much so that it was "the common talke of our neighbour Indians on all sides" that the Narragansett were making preparations "to come against us." In January the Narragansett sachem Canonicus sent a messenger to deliver a declaration of war (a bundle of arrows wrapped in a rattlesnake's skin). But the Governor returned a threatening warning (the skin stuffed with powder and shot), and the Narragansett's resolve dissipated.

The affair left the colony feeling exposed. They decided to impale the settlement by taking down tall trees, dragging them from the forest and sinking them in deep holes closely bound to prevent arrows from passing through. This they did while on half-rations. Moreover, Standish divided the men into four squadrons and drilled them on how to respond to an emergency, including instructions on how to remain armed and alert to a native attack even during a fire in the town.

At the beginning of March, amidst this concern over possible attack, it came time for a promised visit to the Massachuset (a people to their north and outside the confederation led by Massasoit) to trade for furs. While they were preparing to depart, Hobomok advised the leaders that he had learned through rumors told to him while in the woods that the Massachusetts had joined with the Narragansetts, that the Massachusetts would cut off Standish and his men while abroad and that the Narragansetts would attack the settlement with Standish away. Moreover, he claimed that Squanto was part of this plot. The Governor conferred with his advisors and determined that to cancel the promised trading trip was ill-advised both because they desperately needed to replenish their food stores and because it would project an image of fearfulness to "mew up our selves in our new-enclosed towne" which might be invited attack. By the beginning of April Standish and 10 men set out in a shallop taking both Squanto and Hobomok with them (as Bradford put it) "in regarde of the jelocie between them."

== Later folklore ==
Hobbamock converted to Christianity and was beloved by the English until his death in 1642. He died from a European disease that he contracted from his close European friends. Hobbamock was part of the Wampanoag tribe, which, in the Algonquian language, means "People of the Dawn." Other Indians feared Hobomok so much that when they saw him in a battle, they would immediately leave. Hobbamock was specifically asked by Massasoit (the leader of the Wampanoag) to help the Pilgrims. His memory lives on in several place names in modern-day greater Plymouth and surrounding regions.

== Manitou ==
Hobbamock's name may have been a pseudonym, as "Hobbamock" was the name of a powerful manitou. According to Quinnipiac tradition, the giant stone spirit Hobbomock, a prominent figure in many stories, became enraged about the mistreatment of his people and stamped his foot down in anger, diverting the course of the Connecticut River (where the river suddenly swings east in Middletown, Connecticut after several hundred miles of running due south). To prevent him from wreaking such havoc in the future, the good spirit Keitan cast a spell on Hobbomock to sleep forever as the prominent feature of the Sleeping Giant Mountain.

A Pocumtuc story relates that Pocumtuck Ridge and Sugarloaf Mountain were the remains of a giant beaver killed by the giant spirit Hobomock.

The Wangunk tribe attributed seismic activity to an angry Hobbamock.

== References and sources ==
=== Sources ===
==== Primary ====
- Anonymous (1643). New Englands first fruits: in respect, first of the counversion of some, conviction of divers, preparation of sundry of the Indians …. London: Printed by R.O. and G.D. for Henry Overton.
- Bradford, William (1906). Governor William Bradford's Letter Book. Boston, Massachusetts: Massachusetts Society of Mayflower Descendants.
- Bradford, William (n.d.). Of plimouth plantation. Mss. Bradford's important history, Of Plymouth Plantation (referred to in the notes as OPP) was never published during his lifetime and the manuscript disappeared in the late eighteenth century until it was identified in the middle of the nineteenth century.. Since its donation to the Massachusetts Archives in the late 19th century several transcriptions have been made, usually with annotations. The most recent "standard edition' is Morison, Samuel Eliot, ed. (1952). Of Plymouth Plantation, 1620–1647. New York: Alfred A. Knopf. LCCN 51013222. This edition standardizes and modernizes the orthography and makes other changes in punctuation. The first book of the manuscript had been copied into Plymouth church records by Nathaniel Morton, Bradford's nephew and secretary, and it was this version that was annotated and printed in Young 1841, pp. 1–108, the original at a time having been missing since the beginning of the American Revolution. In the decade after the publication by Young, the original manuscript was discovered to be in the library of the Bishop of London in Fulham Palace. The Massachusetts Historical Society arranged for a longhand copy to be made. That version was published in Volume III of the Fourth Series of the Collections of the Massachusetts Historical Society (1856), which volume is hosted by the Internet Archive. When the manuscript was returned to Massachusetts at the end of the 19th century, the Massachusetts legislature commissioned a new transcription to be published. While the version that resulted was more faithful to the idiosyncratic orthography of Bradford, it contained, according to Morison, many of the same mistakes as the transcription published in 1856. The legislature's version was published in 1898. A copy is hosted by the Internet Archive. That version was the basis of the annotated version published as Davis, William T., ed. (1908). Bradford's History of Plymouth Plantation, 1606–1646. New York: C. Scribner's Sons. The 1982 Barnes & Noble reprint of this edition can be found online at HathiTrust. A digitized version with most of Davis's annotations and notes removed is hosted at the University of Maryland's Early Americas Digital Archive. The most amply annotated and literally transcribed edition of the work is Ford 1912. The history of the manuscript is described in the Editorial Preface to the 1856 publication by the Massachusetts Historical Society and more fully in the Introduction of Morison's edition (pp. xxvii–xl), which also contains a history of the published editions of the manuscript (pp. xl–xliii).
- Gookin, Daniel (1792). "Historical Collections of the Indians in New England". Collections of the Massachusetts Historical Society. 3rd series. 1: 141–229. (Reprint of 1674 manuscript.)
- Hubbard, William (1677). A Narrative of the Troubles with the Indians in New-England, from the First Planting thereof in the year 1607. to this Present Year 1677. But Chiefly of the Late Troubles in the Two Last Years, 1675. and 1676. To which is added a discourse about the warre with the Pequods in the year 1637. Boston: Printed by John Foster. LCCN 03026260. This volume was reprinted and annotated as Drake 1865.
- Morton, Nathaniel (1669). New Englands Memorial. Cambridge: S.G. and M.J. for John Ulster of Boston. A facsimile reproduction is contained in Lord, Arthur, ed. (1903). New Englands Memorial. Boston: The Club of Odd Volumes. An early annotated edition is Davis, John, ed. (1826). New-England's Memorial by Nathaniel Morton. Boston: Crocker & Brewster. This book is largely based on the manuscript Of Plymouth Plantation by William Bradford, Morton's uncle.
- Morton, Thomas (1637). New English Canaan, or New Canaan. Amsterdam: Jacob Frederick Stam., an annotated version of which, retaining the original orthography, is contained, together with introductory matter and notes, in Adams, Charles Frances Jr., ed. (1883). New England Canaan of Thomas Morton. Boston: The Prince Society.
- Mourt's Relation (1622). A relation, or, Journall of the beginning and proceedings of the English plantation setled at Plimoth in New England, by certaine English adventurers both merchants and others …. London: Printed for John Bellamie. This work (the authors of which are not credited) is commonly called Mourt's Relation, and is generally accepted to have been written by William Bradford and Edward Winslow (as to the narrative parts) and Robert Cushman (as to the religious and promotional parts). An annotated version was first printed in Young 1841, pp. 109–251. Another annotated version is Dexter, Henry Martyn, ed. (1865). Mourt's Relation or Journal of the Plantation at Plymouth. Boston: John Kimball Wiggin – via Internet Archive. Several different copies of that book are also hosted by HathiTrust. A version with contemporary orthography and comments was published in connection with the Plimouth Plantation, Inc. as Heath, Dwight B., ed. (1963). Mourt's Relation: A Journal of the Pilgrims at Plymouth. Bedford, Massachusetts: Applewood Books. ISBN 0918222842.
- Williams, Roger (1643). A key into the language of America: or, An help to the language of the natives in that part of America, called New-England. London: Printed by Gregory Dexter. A digitized version with modern typeface but 1643 pagination is hosted by the University of Michigan.
- Winslow, Edward (1624). Good newes from New-England: or, A true relation of things very remarkable at the plantation of Plimoth in New-England … Together with a relation of such religious and civill lawes and customes, as are in practise amongst the Indians …. London: Printed by I. D[awson and Eliot's Court Press] for William Bladen and John Bellamie. The work is reprinted, with annotations, in Young 1841, pp. 269–375.
- Wood, William (1634). New Englands Prospect. London: Tho. Coates for John Bellamie. A facsimile reproduction, with original pagination, is printed in an 1865 edition, together with a new preface and one from a 1764 reprinting, by The Society of Boston and hosted by the Internet Archive.

==== Secondary ====
- Adams, Charles Francis (1892). Three Episodes of Massachusetts History. Boston: Houghton, Mifflin and Company. Online (via HathiTrust): Multiple copies. ("The Settlement of Boston Bay" is found in Volume 1, pp. 1–360.
- Baylies, Francis (1830). An Historical Memoir of the Colony of New Plymouth. Vol. I—Part the First. From 1620 to 1641. Boston: Hilliard, Gray, Little, and Wilkins.
- Bragdon, Kathleen J. (1996). Native people of southern New England, 1500-1650. Norman, Oklahoma: University of Oklahoma Press. ISBN 0806128038.
- Drake, Samuel G. (1845). The Book of the Indians, or, Biography and History of the Indians of North America from its First Discovery to the Year 1841 (9th ed.). Boston: Benjamin B. Mussey. ISBN 9780665373534.
- Drake, Samuel G., ed. (1865). The History of the Indian Wars in New England. Roxbury, Massachusetts: Printed for W. Elliot Woodward. LCCN 02015135. Hosted by the Internet Archive in two volumes: Volume I and Volume II.
- Ford, Worthington C. (1912). History of Plymouth Plantation 1620–1647. Boston: Houghton, Mifflin Company for The Massachusetts Historical Society. LCCN 12029493. The work is in two volumes hosted on the Internet Archive as Volume I and Volume II.
- Humins, John H. (March 1987). "Squanto and Massasoit: A Struggle for Power". New England Quarterly. 60 (1): 54–70. doi:10.2307/365654. JSTOR 365654.
- Kinnicutt, Lincoln N. (October 1920). "Plymouth's Debt to the Indians". The Harvard Theological Review. 13 (4): 345–361. doi:10.1017/s0017816000029916. JSTOR 1507717. S2CID 159526670.
- Kupperman, Karen Ordahl (2000). Indians and English: Facing Off in Early America. Ithaca, New York: Cornell University Press. ISBN 0801431786.
- Pulsipher, Jenny Hale (2005). Subjects unto the Same King: Indians, English, and the Contest for Authority in Colonial New England. Philadelphia, Pennsylvania: University of Pennsylvania Press. ISBN 0812238761.
- Robbins, Maurice (July 1956). "Indians of the Old Colony: Their Relation with and their Contribution to the Settlement of the Area". Bulletin of the Massachusetts Archaeological Society. 17 (4): 59–74.
- Russell, Howard S. (1980). Indian New England before the Mayflower. Hanover, New Hampshire: University Press of New England. ISBN 0874511623.
- Salisbury, Neal (1981). "Squanto: Last of the Patuxets". In Sweet, David G.; Nash, Gary B. (eds.). Struggle and Survival in Colonial America. Berkeley, California: University of California Press. pp. 228–245. ISBN 0520041100.
- Salisbury, Neal (1982). Manitou and Providence: Indians, Europeans, and the Making of New England, 1500–1643. New York: Oxford University Press. ISBN 0195034546.
- Salwen, Bert (1978). "Indians of Southern New England and Long Island: Early Period". In Trigger, Bruce G. (ed.). Northeast. Handbook of North American Indians. Vol. 15. Washington, D.C.: Smithsonian Institution. pp. 160–176. ISBN 0160045754. (William C. Sturtevant, general editor.)
- Shuffelton, Frank (March 1976). "Indian Devils and Pilgrim Fathers: Squanto, Hobomok, and the English Conception of Indian Religion". New England Quarterly. 49 (1): 108–116. doi:10.2307/364560. JSTOR 364560.
- Simmons, William S. (June 1979). "Conversion from Indian to Puritan". The New England Quarterly. 52 (2): 197–218. doi:10.2307/364839. JSTOR 364839.
- Simmons, William S. (January 1981). "Cultural Bias in the New England Puritans' Perception of Indians". William and Mary Quarterly. 38 (1): 56–72. doi:10.2307/1916857. JSTOR 1916857.
- Simmons, William (1986). Spirit of the New England Tribes: Indian History and Folklore, 1620–1984. Hanover, New Hampshire: University Press of New England. ISBN 0874513707.
- Willison, George F. (1945). Saints and Strangers. New York: Reynal & Hitchcock. LCCN 45006745.
- Young, Alexander, ed. (1841). Chronicles of the Pilgrim Fathers of the Colony of Plymouth, from 1602–1625. Boston: C. C. Little and J. Brown. LCCN 01012110. Da Capo published a facsimile reprinting of this volume in 1971.
