= John Saunders (colonist) =

English politician (c. 1590–1670)

2nd Governor of Wessagusset Colony
- In office c. October 1622 – March 1623
- Monarch: James VI and I
- Preceded by: Richard Greene
- Succeeded by: Office abolished

Personal details
- Born: c. 1590; England
- Died: June 1670 (aged 79–80); Cape Porpoise, Province of Maine, British America
- Spouse: Ann Sanders
- Children: 3
- Occupation: Politician, Sailor, Planter

John Weeke Saunders (c. 1590 – June 1670), also known as John Sanders, was an English politician, sailor, settler, and planter, who served as the Governor of Wessagusset Colony from 1622 to 1623. He came to the settlement as a member of Thomas Weston's company.

== Wessagusset Colony ==
Saunders accompanied Thomas Weston and his company in his expedition to Wessagusset, arriving there during the July of 1622. Later, upon the death of Richard Greene in October, who was the Governor of Wessagusset Colony, Saunders assumed his position. He remained in the rank for about five months prior to the colony's dissolution.

== Later life and death ==
On June 13, 1670, Saunders, then a Province of Maine planter situated in Cape Porpoise, had grown increasingly ill, compelling him to write a will. His wife inherited his "house and lands for life," and his son, John, inherited 1,000 acres "eight or nine miles above Cape Porpus River Falls.” He died in a matter of days upon the composition, with it being "proved" on June 24, 1670.
