= Paomet =

Extinct Native American tribe from Massachusetts

- The lands of the Paomet (top right) and neighboring tribes prior to 1620.

Total population
- Extinct as a tribe

Regions with significant populations
- United States (Massachusetts)

Languages
- Wôpanâak

Religion
- Unknown

Related ethnic groups
- Other Nauset groups

The Paomet (also anglicized as Pamet, Paomett, Payomet, Pawmit, or Pawmet) (Note: Though the Pamet river was named for the Paomet people, the spelling 'Paomet' is more widely used to refer to the tribe (per Helen McNeil-Ashton, vice president of collections at the Truro Historical Society, quoted in Carson, 2026).) were a Native American group affiliated with the larger Nauset tribe. They inhabited an area near the Pamet River in what is now Barnstable County, Massachusetts.

Though not a part of the Wampanoag confederacy, the Nauset were closely related to the Wampanoag and at times deferred to the authority of the Wampanoag sachem.

The Paomet are now extinct as a tribe.

== Historical accounts ==
=== 1602 − 1614: Early accounts by English explorers ===
The first written record of the Paomet comes from an account by Gabriel Archer, who accompanied the English explorer Bartholomew Gosnold on his 1602 voyage to New England. Of the peninsula which Gosnold would later name Cape Cod, he writes:

This is a low sandy shoal (...) we came to anchor again in sixteen fathoms, fair by the land in the latitude of 42 degrees (...) A young Indian came here to the captain, armed with his bow and arrows, and had certain plates of copper hanging at his ears; he showed a willingness to help us in our occasions.

— Gabriel Archer, 1602

Based on the latitude given by Archer, Gosnold was likely in Paomet lands.

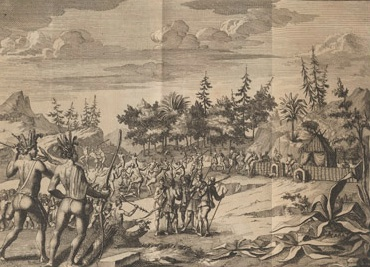
Pring's fortification approached by Paomet men armed with bows, from a 1706 Dutch translation of Samuel Purchas's Pilgrimes.

The English explorer Captain Martin Pring settled in Pamet Harbor for a period of seven weeks during which time he built a small stockade, harvested sassafras, and attempted to cultivate English crops in the New England soil. Pring initially describes friendly relations with the natives - likely the Paomet - during which the groups dined together and made gifts to one another; according to Pring, relations soured after a group estimated by Pring to consist of 140 Paomet men with bows and arrows approached the fort. The approach was halted after Pring fired his gun and called for his two mastiffs after which the Paomet "turned all into a jest and sport, and departed in a friendly manner." Pring adds that a party of around 200 Paomet later returned and made friendly overtures but that he declined further association with the tribe, fearing hostility. He recounts that after his departure the tribe burnt the land on which he had settled.

The English explorer John Smith is the first to mention the Paomet by name in an account of his 1614 voyage along the coast of Massachusetts.

=== 1620 − 1623: Early interactions with the Mayflower pilgrims ===
In 1620 a party of English pilgrims from the Mayflower led by Captain Myles Standish ventured onto Paomet lands. They sighted a native party consisting of five or six people and a dog who fled. The Englishmen pursued but did not catch them. The scouting party later found evidence of habitation near the Pamet River including wetus, cornfields, caches of corn and beans buried under heaps of sand, and a burial ground. Of note, Standish and his men discovered an English tea kettle and a metal bucket near the Paomet dwellings, suggesting prior contact with Europeans. The Mayflower party stole around ten bushels of the corn, as well as objects from the wetus and from a grave site they exhumed. They later sent a message to the Massasoit sachem Ousamequin, then the leader of the Wampanoag confederacy, offering restitution for the theft of the corn. The pilgrims would later go on to found the Plymouth Colony.

On September 13, 1621, a group of Native American leaders signed an "instrument of submission" to the British King James. The Paomet are named as one of the tribes included in this agreement through the consent of Ousamequin.

In 1623 Myles Standish befriended an unnamed Paomet native, who invited the Englishman to spend the night in his hut and promised him corn if he accompanied him back to Paomet lands. The future Plymouth Colony governor Edward Winslow speculated in his 1624 pamphlet Good Newes from New England that the Paomet man planned to kill Standish (though later historians have cast doubt on this claim); if so these attempts were unsuccessful as the Englishman was unable to sleep due to the cold and failed to reach Paomet lands by boat due to heavy winds. Ousamequin, who the English had assisted during an illness, reportedly confided to the Plymouth settlers that the Paomet and several other Wampanoag tribes were plotting an attack on the Plymouth Colony.

=== 1675 − 1678: King Philip's War ===
In April of 1671 the sachems of several Native American tribes, including a Paomet leader called John Quaqaquansuke gathered at Plymouth to affirm their good relations to the colony; the historian Charles Swift speculated that the Plymouth settlers arranged this display due to tensions in the relations between Metacomet and the Plymouth colony.

War broke out in 1675 between the Wampanoag, the English settlers, and their respective native allies. The Nauset, many of whom had converted to Christianity, aided the English in the war. The native people of Cape Cod were relatively unaffected by the war and maintained control of their lands.

=== Conversions to Christianity ===
Following the establishment of permanent English settlements in Cape Cod, many of the Nauset, including the Paomet, converted to Christianity. One of the most notable English evangelists, the reverend Samuel Treat, preached in the Nauset language and translated Christian documents into a written version of the language. Treat worked alongside native teachers selected by their communities; the missionary Captain Richard Bourne names a man called Potanumatack as a Christian teacher to the Paomet tribe. In 1674, Bourne counted 72 "praying Indians" in Pamet and noted that most were literate. By 1693, Treat claimed 505 native converts among four villages in the township of Eastham. Of the few Paomet mentioned by name in English writings, most are identified by Christian names (e.g. John, Peter, Joshua).

Early accounts of the work of Treat and other missionaries portray them as benevolent figures beloved by their native congregations and highlight their efforts to uplift the native communities to which they ministered. More recent analyses have been more critical of these efforts, noting that they demanded the erasure of traditional cultural practices.

=== Land sales and population decline ===
In 1680 two "Indian(s) of Paomett" going by the English names of Peter and Joshua lay claim to part of the land on which the Plymouth colony was constructed. The colony paid the men five pounds and ten shillings and affirmed the right of the Peter, Joshua and their descendants to continue to live on and collect specified resources from the land. Members of the Paomet tribe sold the English settlers additional land which was later incorporated into the town of Truro.

The population of the Nauset tribes declined in the 1700s, with many succumbing to illness. By 1792 only one Native American family remained in Truro. By 1798, most of the remaining Nauset had congregated in Mashpee.

== Cultural practices ==
=== Sustenance and agriculture ===
The 1620 Mayflower scouting party documented corn fields as well as bags red, yellow, and blue varieties of corn buried under heaps of sand in the Paomet lands. The caching of the corn was likely a preservation method; similar caches have been documented elsewhere in Massachusetts. The scouting party also discovered preserved harvests of beans and wheat and noted walnut trees, sassafras, and strawberries growing near the Paomet fields. The wetus were noted to contain dried acorns and other unidentified seeds. The details of the 1680 land agreement suggest that the Paomet also harvested cranberries, "hurtleberries" (likely blueberries, lingonberries, and/or huckleberries) and wild peas.

Historical accounts and archeological evidence suggest that the Paomet hunted with bows and traps and caught fish using nets and harpoons. Deer appear to have been the most significant game animal. An account of the 1620 Mayflower scouting expedition describes the future Plymouth Colony governor William Bradford being caught in a Paomet snare trap:

As we wandered we came to a tree, where a young spirit was bowed down over a bow, and some acorns strewed underneath. Stephen Hopkins said it had been to catch some deer. So as we were looking at it, William Bradford being in the rear, when he came looked also upon it, and as he went about, it gave a sudden jerk up, and he was immediately caught by the leg. It was a very pretty device, made with a rope of their own making and having a noose as artificially made as any roper in England can make...

— Recounted in Mourt's Relation: A Journal of the Pilgrims at Plymouth, 1622

The Mayflower scouting party also found the claws of eagles preserved in the Paomet wetus along with pieces of herring and other fish. Excavations of the shell strata at a site formerly inhabited by the Paomet have uncovered the remains of multiple fish species, including sturgeon. According to the presence and quantity of shellfish remains, oysters were likely the most commonly consumed shellfish, followed by clams and quahogs. The remains of scallops, mussels, and other shellfish were found in lesser quantities.

The details of the 1680 land agreement suggest that the Paomet harvested blubber from beached whales, orcas, and porpoises.

The Mayflower scouting party recorded tobacco seed in the Paomet wetus. The plant referenced as tobacco likely belonged to the species Nicotiana rustica (a species of tobacco cultivated by Native Americans in New England) rather than N. tabacum (the species whose leaves were typically smoked in Europe).

=== Dwellings ===
Like other Nauset groups, the Paomet lived in wetus. These dwellings were constructed of mats woven out of sedge and bulrushes.

The houses were made with young sapling trees, bended [stet] and both ends stuck in the ground. They were made round, like unto an arbor, and covered down to the ground with thick and well wrought mats, and the door was not over a yard high, made of a mat to open. The chimney was a wide open hole in the top, for which they had a mat to cover it close when they pleased. One might stand and go upright in them. In the midst of them were four little trunches knocked into the ground, and small sticks laid over, on which they hung their pots, and what they had to seethe. Round about the fire they lay on mats, which are their beds. The houses were double matted, for as they were matted without, so were they within, with newer and fairer mats.

— Recounted in Mourt's Relation: A Journal of the Pilgrims at Plymouth, 1622

=== Tools and craftsmanship ===
Objects found in the Paomet wetus by the Mayflower scouting party included wooden bowels, trays, and dishes, earthenware pots, and baskets constructed of crab shells.

Many artifacts attributed to the Paomet (and possibly earlier inhabits of the Cape) have been unearthed from the Rose Site, a stratified shell heap 1.5 miles northwest of Truro Center. Tools made of stone, bone, and antler have been unearthed. Among these were knives, spearheads, scrapers, awls, bone harpoons, slate gorgets, stone net-sinkers, a drill, a stone ax, a whetstone, a drill, a celt, and a bone needle.

Multiple fragments of pottery were also found at the Rose Site. Some of these incorporate shell fragments as a tempering agent while others appear to have been mineral-tempered. Several examples cord-marked pottery were found. Other pieces were decorated with the backs of shells or other instruments.

Accounts of the voyages of the English explorers Bartholomew Gosnold and Martin Pring describe the Paomet as wearing jewelry made of a metal which Pring identifies as brass and Gosnold as copper. Both describe the jewelry as consisting of metal plates. Pring describes some of the natives as being adorned with plates "a foot long and halfe a foote broad" worn on the chest. Evidence of local metalworking was found in a burial site near Corn Hill which matched the descriptions of Paomet burial practices documented in Mourt's Relation; the decedent was buried with a knife which appeared to have been constructed from scrap iron through cold working and abrasion.

=== Burial practices ===
The 1620 Mayflower scouting party encountered a site with heaps of sand, one of which was covered by old mats "and had a wooding [stet] thing like a mortar whelmed on the top of it, and an earthen pot laid in a little hole at the end thereof." Upon excavating it, they found a bow and what they presumed to be the decaying remains of arrows. They concluded that it was a grave and did not excavate this site further.

The party later discovered a second burial site, which they disinterred:

(W)e found a place like a grave ... covered with boards ... and resolved to dig it up; where we found first a mat, and under that a fair bow, and then another mat, and under that a board about three quarters [of a yard] long finely carved and painted, with three tines, or broaches, on the top, like a crown. At length we came to a fair new mat, and under that two bundles, one bigger, the other less. We opened the greater, and found in it a great quantity of fine and perfect red powder, and in it the bones and skull of a man .... The skull still had fine yellow hair on it (Note: The American writer James Thacher speculated that the corpse belonged to a sailor from a French ship which had been wrecked near Cape Cod a few years prior to The Mayflower voyage.) .... There was bound up with it a knife, a packneedle and two or three old iron things .... We opened the less bundle likewise, and found of the same powder in it, and the bones and head of a little child. About the legs and other parts of it was bound strings and bracelets of fine white beads .... We brought sundry of the prettiest things away with us, and covered the corpse up again.

— Recounted in Mourt's Relation: A Journal of the Pilgrims at Plymouth, 1622

The red powder, described as having a strong odor, is thought to have been red ochre.

In 1915, a pair of archeologists discovered a grave site near Corn Hill which was very similar in composition to the account given by the Mayflower party. This grave also consisted of six layers separated by wooden boards and contained red ochre powder. Charcoal found at the grave site suggests that a fire was briefly lit atop the grave. The decedent had been buried with an iron blade, which appeared to have been crafted from scrap iron through cold working and abrasion. The skeletal remains found in the grave appeared to have been dis-articulated.

== Legacy ==
=== Place names ===
The Pamet River in Massachusetts is named after the Paomet people. The town of Corn Hill was so named as it was the location where the Plymouth settlers stole corn from Paomet stores. The Payomet Performing Arts Center in North Truro was also named after the tribe.

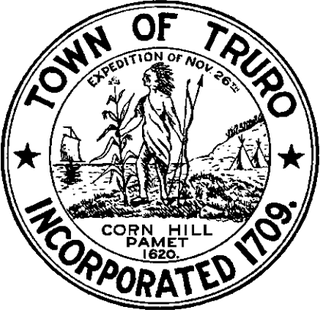
The former town seal of Truro

=== Truro town seal ===
The former town seal of Truro, Massachusetts depicted a Native American in a feathered headdress standing in front of two tipis. The seal was criticized by some residents and historians for its inaccurate depiction of the Paomet people. A new seal approved in May 2026 does not depict any figures but includes the word 'Paomet' in homage to the former tribe.

=== Monuments and proposed future projects ===
In April 2023 Wampanoag leaders honored the Paomet people during a groundbreaking ceremony for a traditional wetu constructed on the tribe's former land. This was completed in June 2023. Members of the Wampanoag community have rendered concepts for four additional memorials to the Paomet: a sculpture of the giant Maushop from Wampanoag folklore at High Head, a garden path at Corn Hill, signage at Village Pond, and an art installation at Pamet Park including a stone monument depicting a village scene.

== See also ==
- Native American tribes in Massachusetts
