= Richard Greene (colonist) =

Richard Greene (died October 1622) was the first Governor of Wessagusset Colony in New England, located in modern-day Weymouth, Massachusetts. He died at Plymouth colony after having only governed the ill-fated Wessagusset colony for a few months since its creation in July. He was the brother-in-law of Thomas Weston, the primary investor in the colony.

Preceded by n/a	Governor of Wessagusset Colony; July 1622 – October 1622	Succeeded by John Saunders
