= Degory Priest =

Mayflower passenger (c.1579–c.1621)

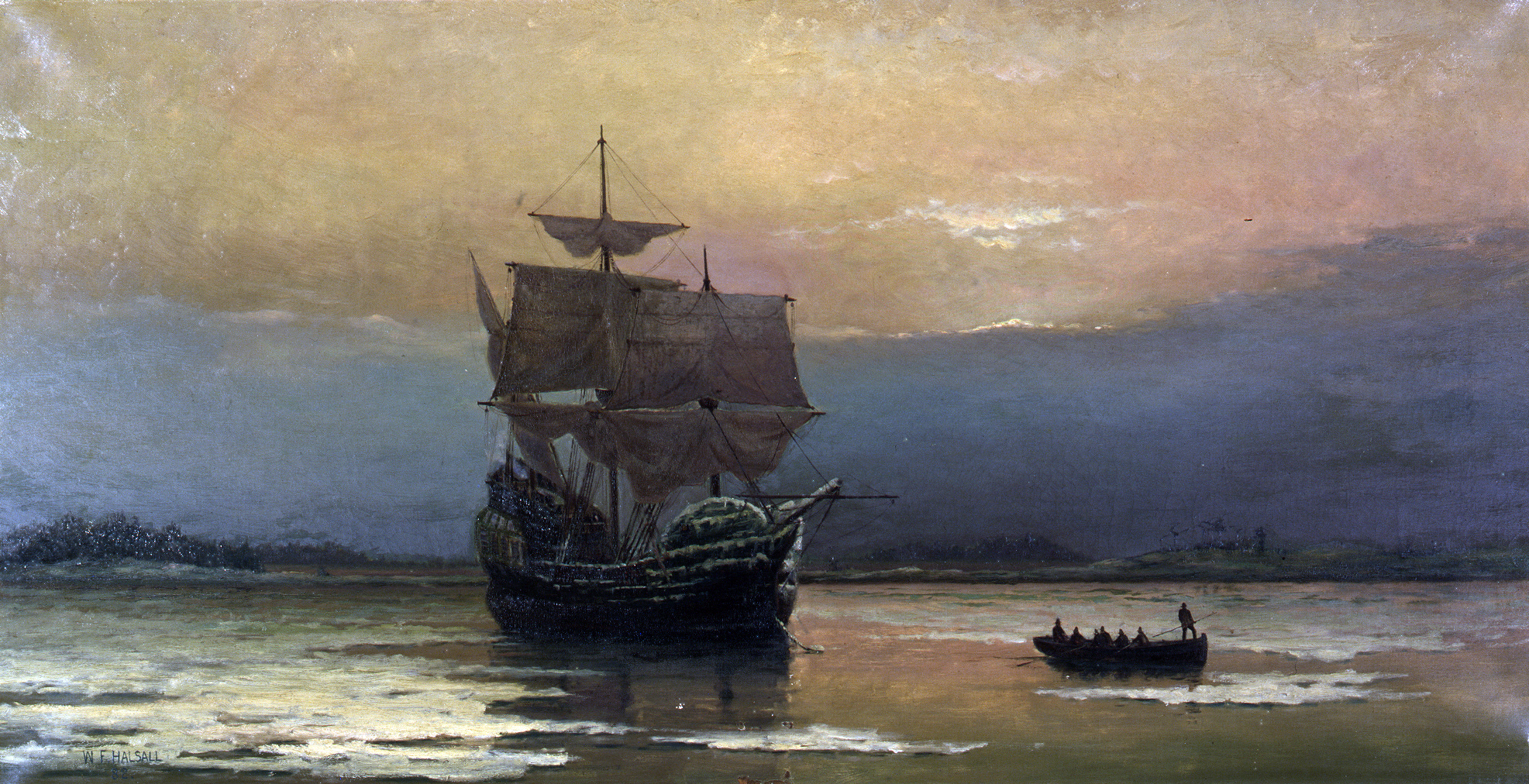
Mayflower in Plymouth Harbor by William Halsall (1882)

Degory Priest (c. 1579 – c. 1621) was a member of the Leiden contingent on the historic 1620 voyage of the ship Mayflower. He was a hat maker from London who married Sarah, sister of Pilgrim Isaac Allerton in Leiden. He was a signatory to the Mayflower Compact in November 1620 and died less than two months later.

In some documents of the time, his name was also written as Digory Priest.

== English origins ==
According to Banks, the name Digory Priest or Prust is common in Devon and Cornwall. A family with those names was found residing in Lezant, co. Cornwall.

At the time of the Pilgrim emigration, families of this name were living in the London parishes of All Hallows the Great, All Hallows on the Wall, St. Augustine, St. Dunstan-in-the-West and St. Margaret Patten.

== Life in Holland ==
Per Banks, "Digory" Priest was credited as one of the "Leyden" contingent and was again identified as a hat-maker from London in Leyden records.

His name appears in many Leiden records of the time, being comparatively active in comparison to other church members. He became a citizen (burgess) of Leiden on November 16, 1615, with guarantors being future Mayflower compatriot Isaac Allerton and Roger Wilson.

Several Leiden incidents in June 1617 are recorded regarding Degory Priest’s involvement in activities that border on assault in one case and adultery in another. On June 28, 1617, Priest requested two tobacco pipe-makers to sign an affidavit that he had not hit John Cripps on June 17, 1617, but only "touched his Jabot" – i.e., the frill on the front of his shirt. The affidavit may have been needed by Priest to document his innocence in what could have been an assault case. And on the next day, June 18, 1617, Priest needed another affidavit, this time also involving John Cripps, card maker, who was rumored to have been in an adulterous relationship with Elizabeth, who was the wife of Leiden woolcomber John Mos.

On April 9, 1619, Degory Priest and Samuel Lee, both hatters, signed a good behavior document on behalf of Nicholas Claverly, a tobacco-pipe maker, who had arrived in Leiden about 1615 and resided in a house owned by Degory Priest. In the document, Priest stated an age of forty years, which indicated he was born about 1579.

Records show that on May 3, 1619, Degory Priest witnessed an affidavit to a statement signed by Richard Tyrill stating that Nicholas Claverly was not connected with the murder of Tyrill’s brother John Tyrill.

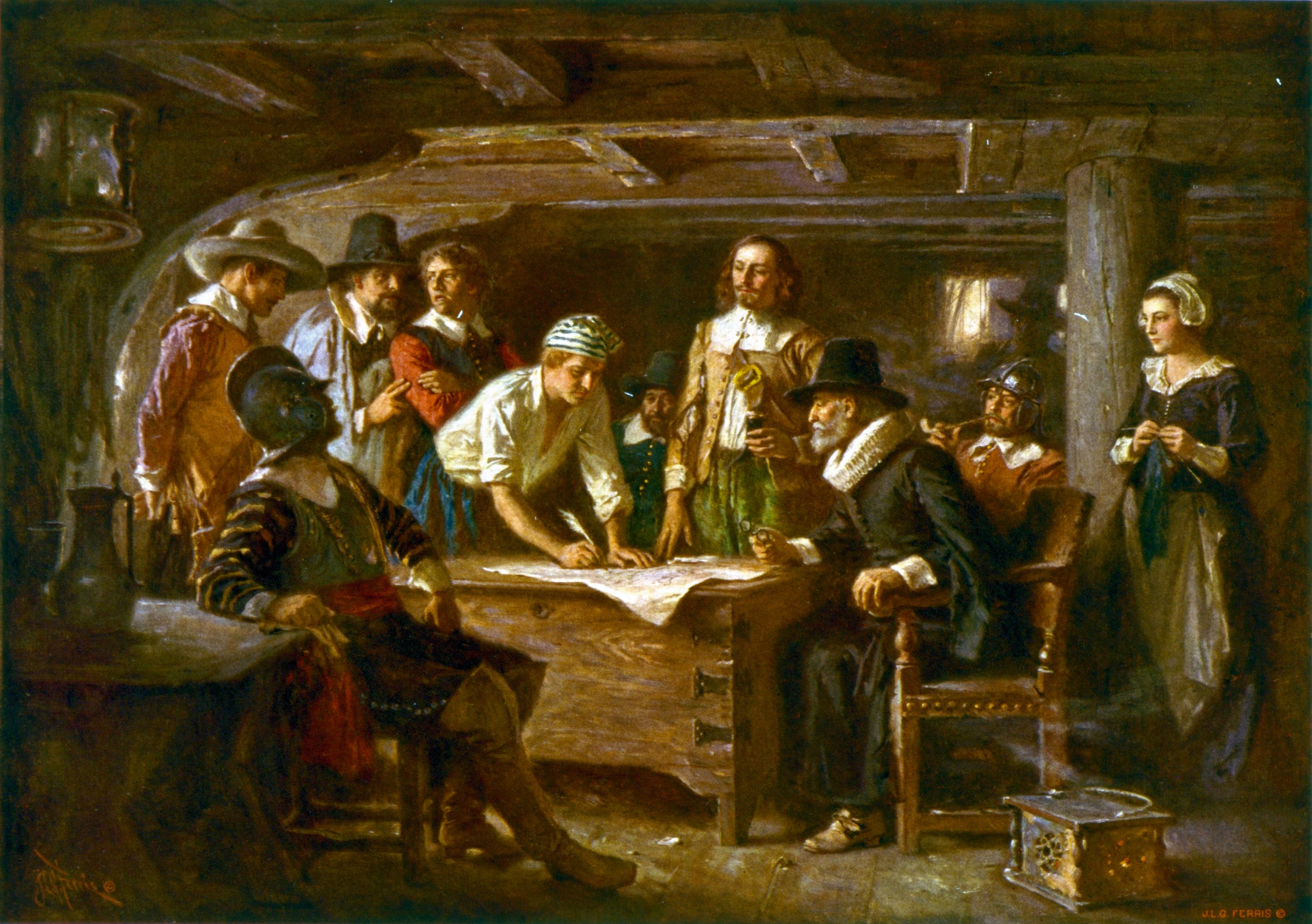
Signing the Mayflower Compact 1620, a painting by Jean Leon Gerome Ferris, 1899

Degory Priest departed Plymouth, England, aboard the Mayflower on September 6/16, 1620. The small, 100-foot ship had 102 passengers and a crew of about 30-40 in extremely cramped conditions. By the second month out, the ship was being buffeted by strong westerly gales, causing the ship‘s timbers to be badly shaken with caulking failing to keep out sea water, and with passengers, even in their berths, lying wet and ill. This, combined with a lack of proper rations and unsanitary conditions for several months, contributed to illness that would be fatal for many, especially the majority of women and children. On the way, there were two deaths, a crew member and a passenger, but the worst was yet to come after arriving at their destination when, in the space of several months, almost half the passengers perished in cold, harsh, unfamiliar New England winter.

On November 9/19, 1620, after about three months at sea, including a month of delays in England, they spotted land, which was the Cape Cod Hook, now called Provincetown Harbor. After several days of trying to get south to their planned destination of the Colony of Virginia, strong winter seas forced them to return to the harbor at Cape Cod hook, where they anchored on November 11/21. The Mayflower Compact was signed that day. Degory Priest was a signatory to the Mayflower Compact on November 11, 1620.

From William Bradford’s later recollection of seven men from the Mayflower who died soon after arrival, "Digerie Preist" among them, with this comment: "All these dyed sone after their arrival in the general sickness that befell." And with this about Priest’s family: "But Digerie Preist had his wife and children sent hither afterwards, she being Mr. Allertons sister." Bradford closed his comments in this section with the note: "But the rest left no posteritie here."

== Marriage and family ==
Degory Priest married Sarah (Allerton) Vincent on November 4, 1611. She was the widow of John Vincent and sister of Mayflower passenger Isaac Allerton. They had two daughters, Mary and Sarah.

Sarah Priest married 2nd in Leiden on or shortly after November 13, 1621, Godbert Godbertson, whose name, per Banks, was also written as Cuthbert Cuthbertson. He was a hat-maker from Leiden, as was Priest, and had been in communion with the Pilgrims before their emigration. He had previously been married to Elizabeth Kendall in 1617, who presumably was deceased by the time of his second marriage. They came to Plymouth on the ship Anne in 1623 with their son and her two daughters. Both Sarah and her second husband Godbert Godbertson died in 1633 in the epidemic that was rampant at that time. Their burial places are unknown.

== Children of Degory Priest and his wife Sarah (Allerton) Priest ==
- Mary Priest was born about 1612 and died in Charlestown in 1689. She married Phineas Pratt by 1633 and had eight children. The family moved to Charlestown about 1646. Pratt was a person of note in Plymouth history, coming on the ship Sparrow in 1622, being one of Thomas Weston's settlers at the failed Weymouth settlement, and coming to Plymouth in 1623.
- Sarah Priest was born about 1614, went to England by October 1646, and may have died there, date and place unknown. She married John Coombs about 1632 and had two sons. For reasons that are not known, possibly the demise of her husband, Sarah traveled to England about 1645 and left her two sons, John and Francis Coombs, in the care of William Spooner, who had agreed to their maintenance. It is believed that Sarah never returned to Massachusetts Colony, either having died on the voyage, or in England.

== Death and burial ==
Priest died early in the first winter, on January 1, 1621, of the "general sickness". He was aged about 42 years.

He was buried likely sometime in January 1621 in Cole's Hill Burial Ground in Plymouth, most probably in an unmarked grave, as was the custom that first winter. Along with many others who died in the winter of 1620–1621, his name is memorialized on the Pilgrim Memorial Tomb, located on Cole's Hill in Plymouth.

== Sarah Allerton, wife of Degory Priest and Godbert Godbertson ==
After Priest’s death, his wife Sarah married another hat-maker, Godbert Godbertson (or Cuthbert Cuthbertson), on November 13, 1621, with whom she had one son, Samuel, born possibly about 1622. Godbertson was said by Edward Winslow to be an English speaker of the Dutch Church and a member of the Separatist church in Leiden. They came, with their son Samuel Cuthbertson (later shortened to Cuthbert) and her daughters Mary and Sarah Priest, to Plymouth on the ship Anne in 1623. They were assigned land in the 1623 Division of Land with 6 "akers" for "Cudbart Cudbartsone" – one acre for the deceased Priest and one each for his wife Sarah, her second husband Godbert Godbertson and their three children. Both Godbertson and his wife Sarah died in the Massachusetts smallpox epidemic of 1633 sometime that fall, with their estate inventories being taken on October 24, 1633. Their burial places are unknown.

Sarah Allerton was the sister of a Mayflower passenger, Isaac Allerton.
