= Corn Hill (Massachusetts) =

Hill in Massachusetts, US

- Location within Massachusetts Location within the United States

Highest point
- Elevation: 118 ft (36 m)
- Coordinates: 42°00′14″N 70°04′48″W

Geography
- Location: Cape Cod, Massachusetts
- Topo map: USGS North Truro

Corn Hill is a hill in Barnstable County, Massachusetts. It is located 2.2 miles (3.5 km) south of North Truro in the Town of Truro. Smalls Hill is located east of Corn Hill. The Pilgrims are believed to have discovered (and taken much of) a cache of Payomet Indian seed corn from the top of Corn Hill in November 1620, before they moved on from their landing at today’s Provincetown to the current location of Plymouth.
