= Myles Standish =

English military officer (1584–1656)

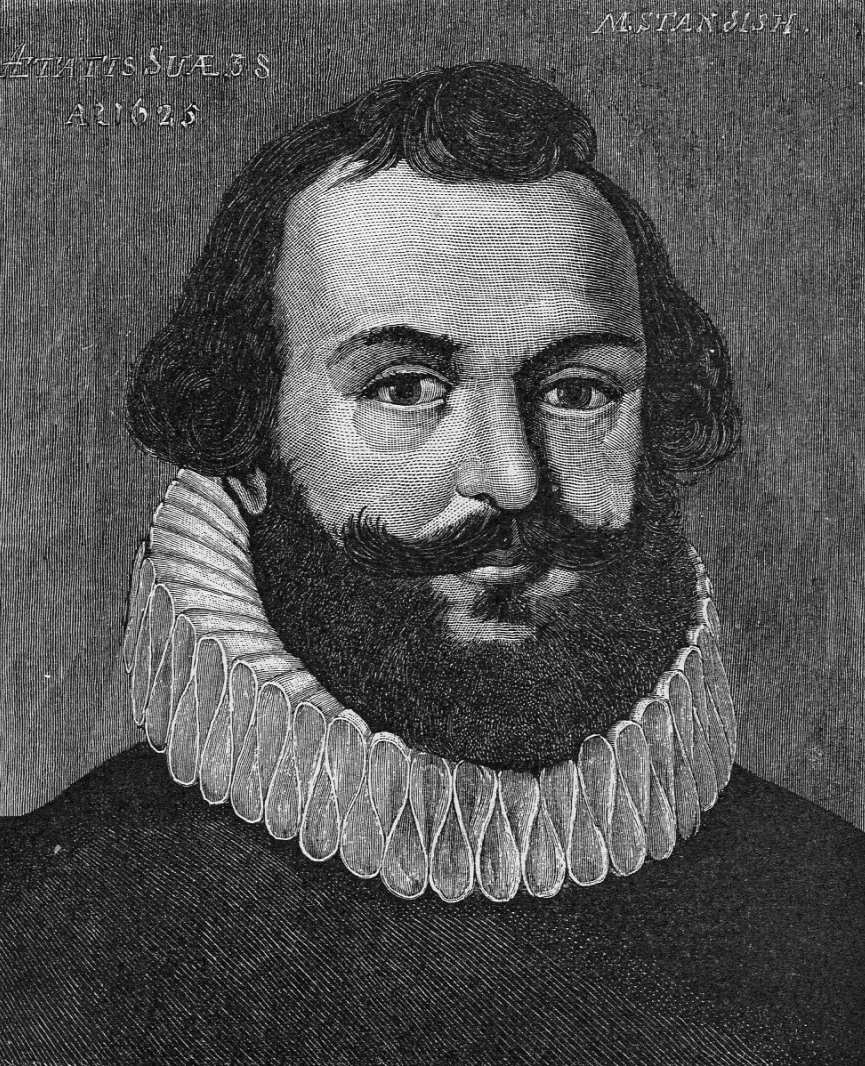
- An 1885 portrait of Standish, alleged to be a 1625 likeness, although its authenticity has never been proven
- Born: c. 1584; West Derby or Leyland Hundred, Lancashire, England
- Died: October 3, 1656 (aged c. 72); Duxbury, Plymouth Colony
- Spouse(s): Rose Standish (died 1621) Barbara Standish (m. 1624)
- Military career
- Allegiance: England; Plymouth Colony
- Rank: Captain
- Commands: Plymouth Colony militia
- Conflicts: Eighty Years' War (Netherlands); Wessagusset Colony (Plymouth Colony)

Myles Standish (c. 1584 – October 3, 1656) was an English military officer and colonist. He was hired as military adviser for Plymouth Colony in present-day Massachusetts, United States, by the Pilgrims. Standish accompanied the Pilgrims on the ship Mayflower and played a leading role in the administration and defense of Plymouth Colony from its foundation in 1620. On February 17, 1621, the Plymouth Colony militia elected him as its first commander and continued to re-elect him to that position for the remainder of his life. Standish served at various times as an agent of Plymouth Colony on a return trip to England, as assistant governor of the colony, and as its treasurer.

A defining characteristic of Standish's military leadership was his proclivity for preemptive action. He led at least two attacks or small skirmishes against Native Americans in a raid on the village of Nemasket and a conflict at Wessagusset Colony. During these actions, Standish exhibited skill as a soldier, but disturbed more moderate members of the colony due to his brutality toward Natives.

Standish led a botched expedition against French troops at Penobscot in 1635, one of his last military actions. By the 1640s, he relinquished his role as an active soldier and became a farmer in Duxbury, Massachusetts, where he was one of the first settlers. He remained nominal commander of the Pilgrim military forces in the growing colony, but acted in an advisory capacity. He died in his home in Duxbury in 1656 at age 72. Standish supported and defended the Pilgrims' colony for much of his life, though there is no evidence to suggest that he ever joined their church.

Several towns and military installations have been named after Standish, and monuments have been built in his memory. He appears as lead character in the 1858 poem The Courtship of Miles Standish by Henry Wadsworth Longfellow, a highly fictionalized account which presents him as a timid romantic. The poem was popular in the 19th century and played a role in cementing the Pilgrim story in American culture.

== Birthplace and early military service ==
Little is known of Standish's origin and early life: his place of birth has been debated by historians. Standish's will, drafted in Plymouth Colony in 1656, claims rights of inheritance to property in several locations:

I give unto my son & heire apparent Alexander Standish all my lands as heire apparent by lawfull decent in Ormskirke [Ormskirk] Borscouge [Burscough] Wrightington Maudsley [Mawdesley] Newburrow [Newburgh] Crowston [Croston] and in the Isle of man [sic] and given to mee as Right heire by lawfull decent but Surruptuously detained from mee My great Grandfather being a 2cond or younger brother from the house of Standish of Standish.

All but one of the places named in Standish's will are in Lancashire, England, with the exception being the Isle of Man. Some historians have concluded that he was therefore born in Lancashire – possibly in the vicinity of Chorley, where a family named Standish owned a manor called Duxbury Hall. However, there is no conclusive evidence linking Myles Standish to that family. A competing interpretation is that he belonged to a Manx branch of the Standish family. No definitive documentation of his birth exists in either Lancashire or the Isle of Man. However, in recent times, the Isle of Man could be referencing a farm near Croston.

The next earliest source on Standish's family and early life is a short passage recorded by Nathaniel Morton, secretary of Plymouth Colony, who wrote in his New England's Memorial (published 1669) that Standish:

was a gentleman, born in Lancashire, and was heir apparent unto a great estate of lands and livings, surreptitiously detained from him; his great grandfather being a second or younger brother from the house of Standish. In his younger time he went over into the low countries, and was a soldier there, and came acquainted with the church at Leyden, and came over into New England, with such of them as at the first set out for the planting of the plantation of New Plymouth, and bare a deep share of their first difficulties, and was always very faithful to their interest.

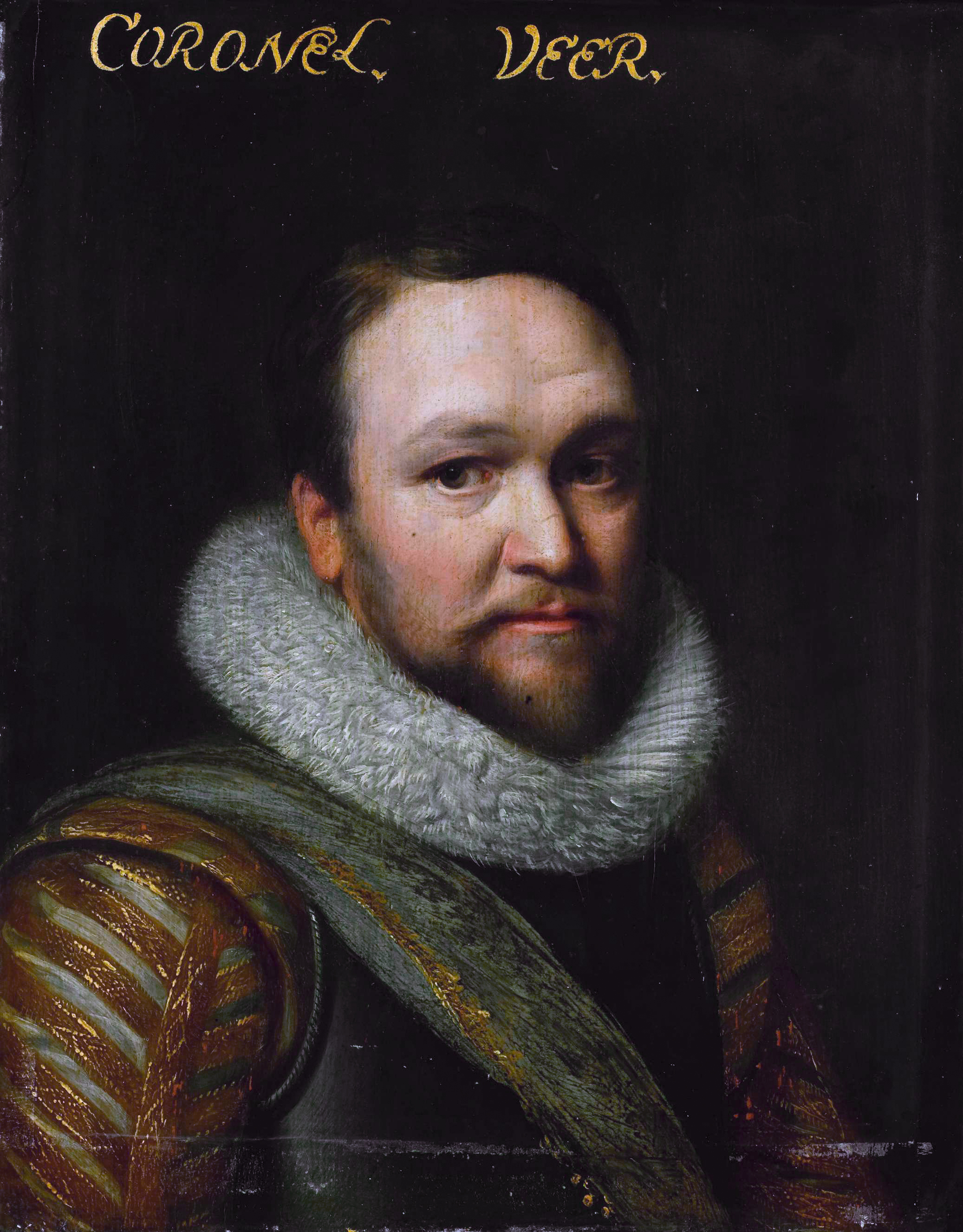
Sir Horatio Vere was the commander of English troops in the Netherlands during the siege of Sluis in 1604, under whom Standish likely served.

Standish's early military career in the Low Countries is unclear. At the time, the Dutch Republic was embroiled in the Eighty Years' War with Spain. Queen Elizabeth I of England supported the Protestant Dutch Republic and sent troops to fight the Spanish in the Netherlands, as part of the Anglo-Spanish War (1585–1604). Historians are divided on Standish's role in the English military. Nathaniel Philbrick refers to him as a "mercenary", suggesting that he was a hired soldier of fortune seeking employment in the war, but Justin Winsor claims that Standish received a commission as a lieutenant in the English army and was later promoted to captain while in Holland. Historian Jeremy Bangs argued that Standish likely served under Sir Horatio Vere, the general who led the English troops in the Netherlands at this time. Vere is known to have recruited soldiers for the expedition in both Lancashire and the Isle of Man, among other places. According to historian Tudor Jenks, Standish came to the Netherlands around 1603 and may have seen service during the siege of Sluis in 1604, which involved Vere's English troops. The subsequent Treaty of London (1604) ended English involvement in the war; if Standish was a mercenary he might have continued to serve with the Dutch until the Twelve Years' Truce brought fighting in the region to a halt in 1609.

Standish's activities and whereabouts are unrecorded until 1620, at which point he was living with his wife Rose in Leiden, Holland and using the title of "Captain". There he was hired by a group of refugee Puritan dissenters from England who intended to form a colony in North America (the Pilgrims). Standish was employed as their military adviser. The Puritans had previously hoped the position would be taken by Captain John Smith, who had been one of the founders of the English colony at Jamestown, Virginia, and had experience exploring and mapping the American coast. The Pilgrims approached Smith and he expressed interest, but his price was too high and the Pilgrims feared that his fame and bold character might lead him to become a dictator. They appointed Standish instead; he was apparently already known to the Pilgrims.

== Voyage to New Plymouth ==
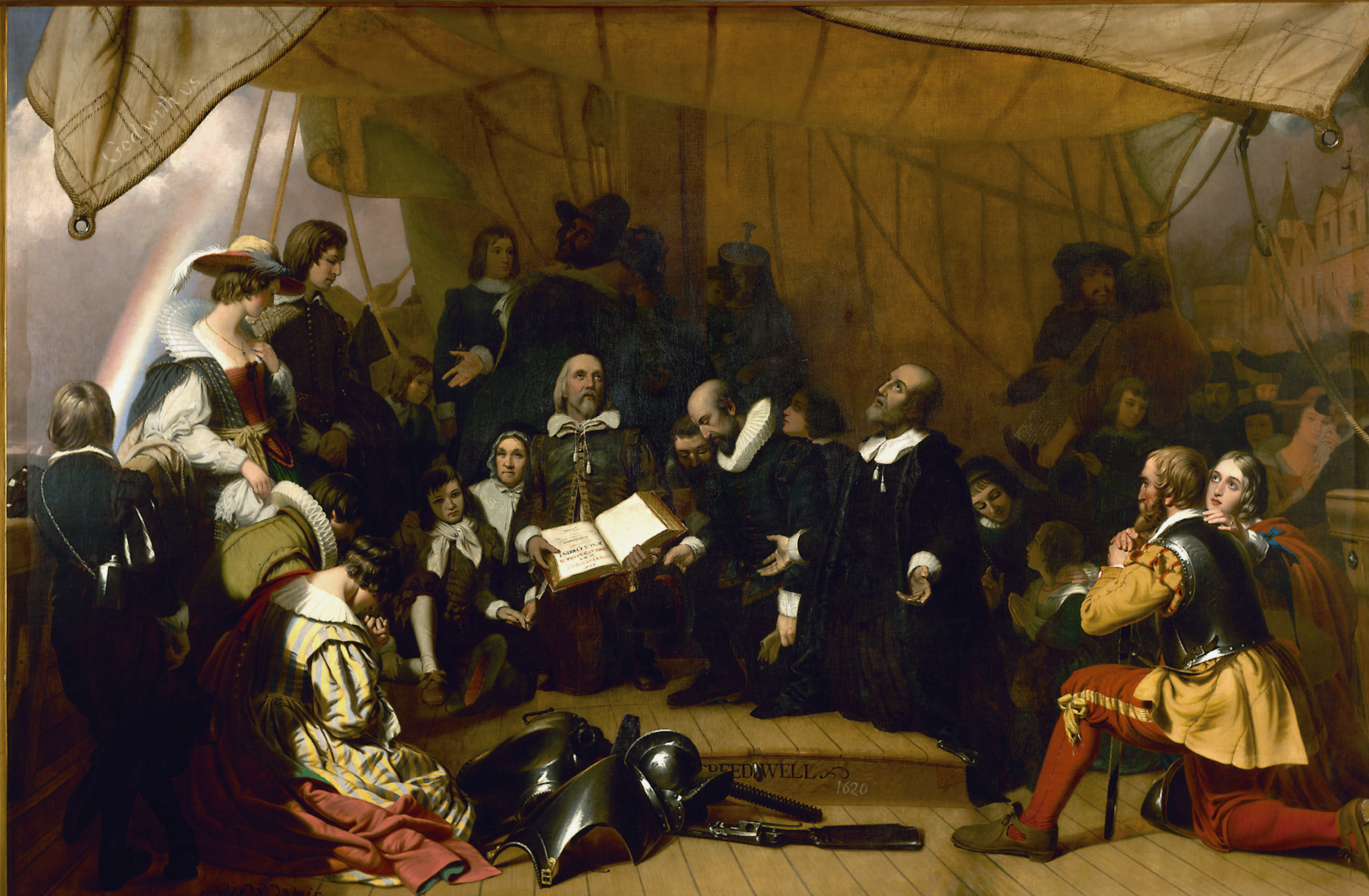
The Embarkation of the Pilgrims, 1843, US Capitol Rotunda. Myles and Rose Standish are prominently depicted in the foreground on the right.

On July 22, 1620 (Old Style date), the initial group of English Dissenters living in Leiden boarded the Speedwell, which was meant to accompany another ship to be hired in England. This initial group included the mostly Brownist congregation. Myles and Rose Standish were aboard, along with the Bradfords, Winslows, Carvers, and others. The small, 60-ton pinnace sailed to Southampton with about 30 passengers, to be provisioned and join a much larger vessel for the voyage to the New World. Another 90 passengers would board the 180-ton Mayflower. The Speedwell had some significant leaks while in port that caused delays, but both vessels departed Southampton on August 5.

The leaders of the colony decided to leave the smaller Speedwell behind after numerous delays caused by leaking, which had caused them to return to port twice. The Standishes and most of the Speedwell passengers crowded into the Mayflower, and the Speedwell went on to London to be resold, now with only a few passengers. The Mayflower passengers, meanwhile, sold some valuable supplies such as butter to pay the mounting port fees, and finally departed Plymouth, England, on September 6, 1620, bound for the northern part of the Virginia Colony.

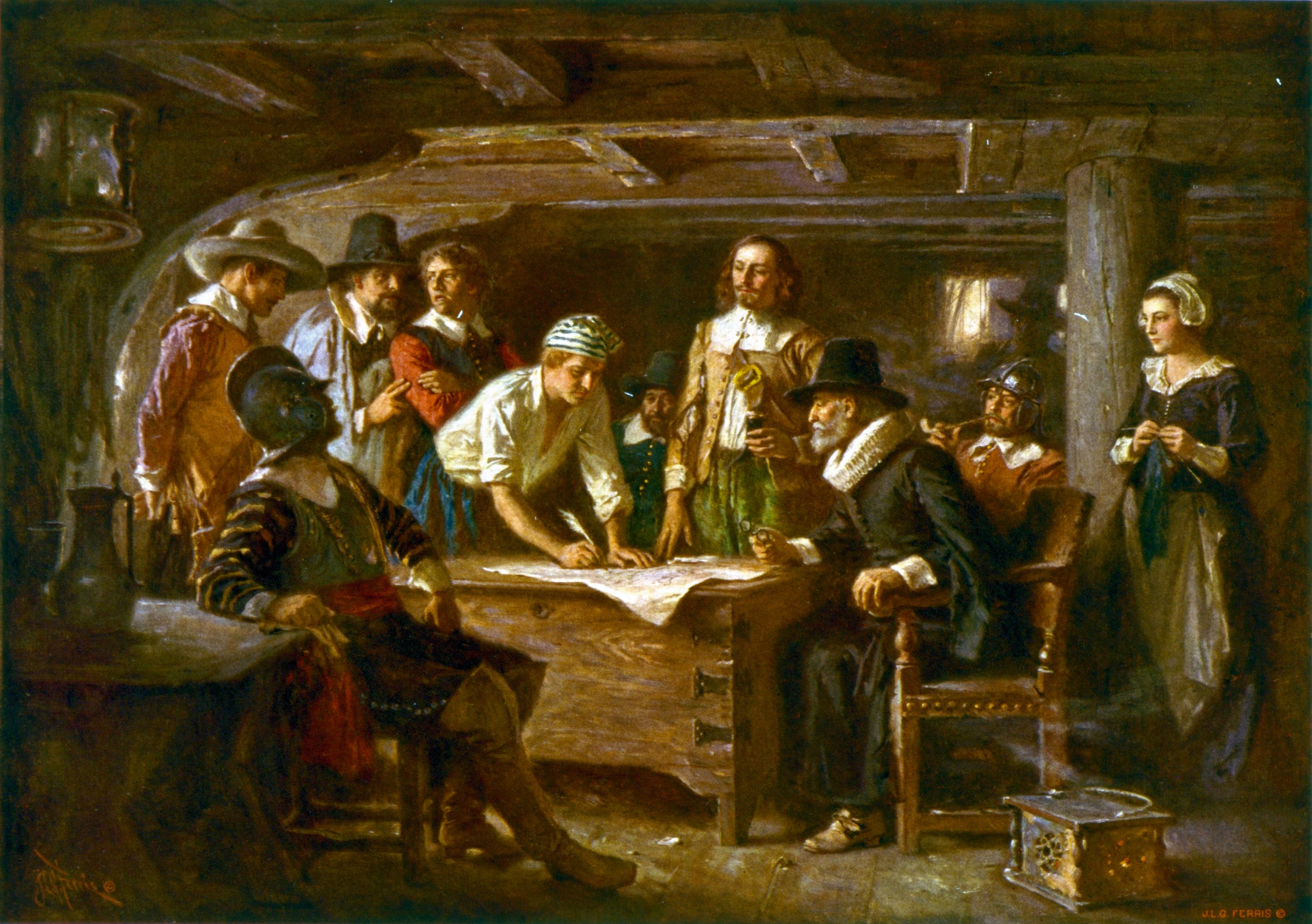
The Mayflower Compact, a painting by Jean Leon Gerome Ferris

On November 9, 1620, lookouts spotted land, but they discovered that they were near Cape Cod and about 200 miles (320 km) east-northeast of their planned destination of northern Virginia. They tried briefly to sail south, but strong seas forced them to retreat to Cape Cod to harbor near the hook of Provincetown Harbor. It became apparent that the weather would not permit the passage south, so they decided to settle near Cape Cod. Shortage of supplies (including wood and beer) and the roaring Atlantic made it too dangerous to press on for a Virginia landing. They anchored at the hook on November 11, and the leaders of the colony wrote the Mayflower Compact to ensure a degree of law and order in this place where they had not been granted a patent to settle. Myles Standish was one of the 41 men who signed it.

== Establishment of Plymouth Colony ==
The Mayflower was anchored off Cape Cod when Standish urged the colony's leaders to allow him to take a party ashore to find a suitable place for settlement. On November 15, 1620, he led 16 men on foot in exploration of the northern portion of the Cape. On December 11, he led a group of 18 and made an extended exploration of the shore of Cape Cod by boat, spending their nights ashore surrounded by makeshift barricades of tree branches. They were attacked one night by a group of about 30 Indians. They panicked, but Standish calmed them, urging them not to fire their matchlock muskets unnecessarily. The incident took place in Eastham, Massachusetts, and came to be known as the First Encounter.

After further exploration, the Pilgrims chose a location in Plymouth Bay in late December 1620 as the site for their settlement. Standish provided important counsel on the placement of a small fort in which cannon were mounted, and on the layout of the first houses for maximum defensibility. They had built only one single-room house when illness struck. Only 50 survived the first winter out of the 100 or so who arrived on the Mayflower. Standish's wife Rose died in January.

Standish was one of the very few who did not fall ill, and William Bradford credited him with comforting many and being a source of strength to those who suffered. Standish tended to Bradford during his illness, and this was the beginning of a decades-long friendship. Bradford held the position of governor for most of his life and, by necessity, worked closely with Standish. The two men were opposites in terms of character; Bradford was patient and slow to judgment, while Standish was well known for his fiery temper. Despite their differences, the two worked well together in managing the colony and responding to dangers as they arose.

== Military action in support of Plymouth Colony ==
By February 1621, the colonists had sighted Indians several times, but there had been no communication. The men of the colony were anxious to prepare themselves in case of hostilities, so they formed a militia on February 17, 1621, consisting of all able-bodied men, electing Standish as their commander. The leaders of Plymouth Colony had already hired him for that role, but this vote ratified the decision by democratic process. The men of Plymouth Colony continued to re-elect him to that position for the remainder of his life. As captain of the militia, he regularly drilled his men in the use of pikes and muskets.

Contact with the Indians came in March 1621 through Samoset, an English-speaking Abenaki who arranged for the Pilgrims to meet with Massasoit, the sachem of the nearby Pokanoket tribe. On March 22, Plymouth Colony's governor John Carver signed a treaty with Massasoit, declaring an alliance between the Pokanokets and the Colonists and requiring the two parties to defend one another in times of need. Governor Carver died the same year and the responsibility of upholding the treaty fell to his successor William Bradford. Bradford and Standish were frequently preoccupied with the complex task of reacting to threats against both the Pilgrims and the Pokanokets from tribes such as the Massachusetts and the Narragansetts. As threats arose, Standish typically advocated intimidation to deter their rivals. Such behavior at times made Bradford uncomfortable, but he found it an expedient means of maintaining the treaty with the Pokanokets.

=== Nemasket raid ===
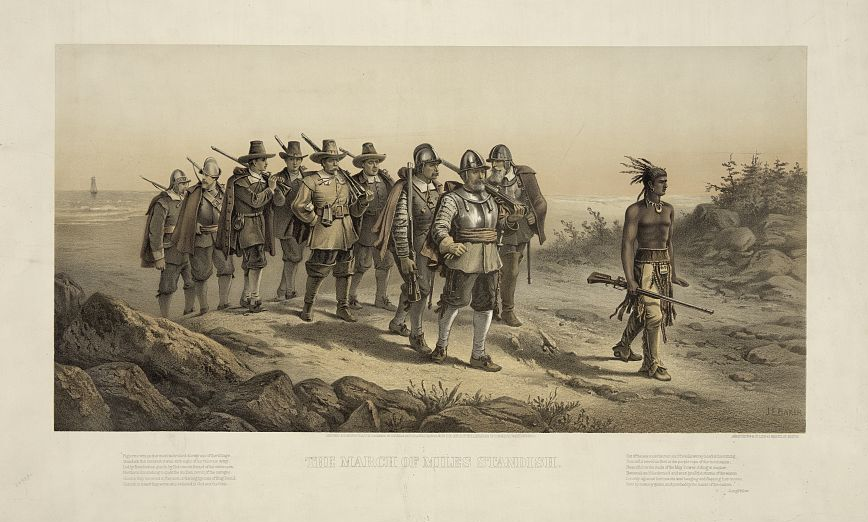
An 1873 lithograph depicting the expedition against Nemasket led by Standish and guided by Hobbamock

The first challenge to the treaty came in August 1621 when a sachem named Corbitant began to undermine Massasoit's leadership. Corbitant worked to turn the people against Massasoit in the Pokanoket village of Nemasket, now the site of Middleborough, Massachusetts, about 14 miles (23 km) west of Plymouth. Bradford sent two trusted interpreters to determine what was happening in Nemasket: Tisquantum (known to the English as Squanto) and Hobbamock. Tisquantum had been pivotal in providing counsel and aid to the Pilgrims, ensuring the survival of the colony. Hobbamock was another influential ally, a high-ranking advisor to Massasoit and a warrior who commanded particular respect and fear among the Indians. When Tisquantum and Hobbamock arrived in Nemasket, Corbitant took Tisquantum captive and threatened to kill him. Hobbamock escaped to warn Plymouth.

Bradford and Standish agreed that this represented a dangerous threat to the Plymouth-Pokanoket alliance and decided to act quickly. On August 14, 1621, Standish led a group of 10 men to Nemasket, determined to kill Corbitant. They were guided by Hobbamock who quickly befriended Standish, and the two men were close for the remainder of their lives. In his old age, Hobbamock became part of Standish's household in Duxbury.

Reaching Nemasket, Standish planned a night attack on the shelter in which Corbitant was believed to be sleeping. That night, he and Hobbamock burst into the shelter, shouting for Corbitant. As frightened Pokanokets attempted to escape, Standish's men outside fired their muskets, wounding a Pokanoket man and woman who were later taken to Plymouth to be treated. Standish soon learned that Corbitant had already fled the village and Tisquantum was unharmed.

Standish had failed to capture Corbitant, but the raid had the desired effect. On September 13, 1621, nine sachems came to Plymouth, including Corbitant, to sign a treaty of loyalty to King James.

=== Palisade ===
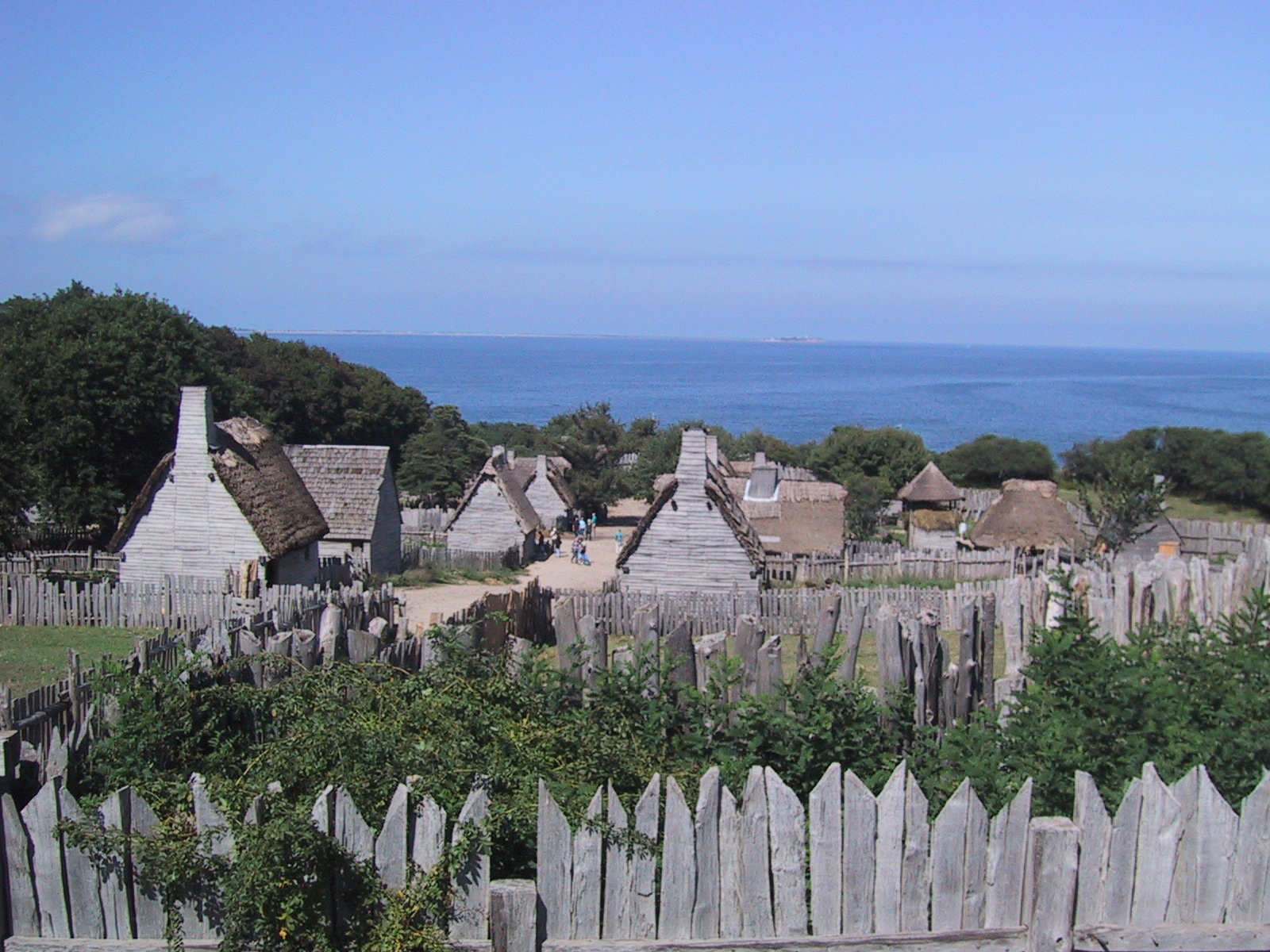
Plimoth Patuxet, a replica reconstruction of the original Pilgrim village in Plymouth, Massachusetts, including the palisade surrounding the settlement

In November 1621, a Narragansett messenger arrived in Plymouth and delivered a bundle of arrows wrapped in a snakeskin. Tisquantum and Hobbamock told them that this was a threat and an insult from Narragansett sachem Canonicus. The Narragansetts lived west of Narragansett Bay in Rhode Island and were one of the more powerful tribes in the region. Bradford sent back the snakeskin filled with gunpowder and shot in an effort to show that they were not intimidated.

Standish took the threat seriously and urged that the colonists encircle their small village with a palisade made of tall, upright logs. The proposal would require a wall more than half a mile (or 0.8 km) long. In addition, he recommended the construction of strong gates and platforms for shooting over the wall. The colony had recently been reinforced by the arrival of new colonists from the ship Fortune, but there were still only 50 men to work on the task. Despite the challenges, the settlers constructed the palisade per Standish's recommendations in just three months, finishing in March 1622. Standish divided the militia into four companies, one to man each wall, and drilled them in defending the village in the event of attack.

=== Wessagusset ===
A more serious threat came from the Massachusett tribe to the north and was precipitated by the arrival of a new group of English colonists. In April 1622, the vanguard of a new colony arrived in Plymouth. They had been sent by merchant Thomas Weston to establish a new settlement somewhere near Plymouth. The men chose a site on the shore of the Fore River in Weymouth, Massachusetts, about 25 miles (40 km) north of Plymouth, and they called their colony Wessagusset. The settlers of the poorly managed colony infuriated the Massachusett tribe through theft and recklessness. By March 1623, Massasoit had learned that a group of influential Massachusett warriors intended to destroy both the Wessagusset and Plymouth colonies. He warned Plymouth to strike first. One of the colonists of Wessagusset named Phineas Pratt verified that his settlement was in danger. He managed to escape to Plymouth and reported that the colonists in Wessagusset had been repeatedly threatened by the Massachusetts, that the settlement was in a state of constant watchfulness, and that men were dying at their posts from starvation.

Bradford called a public meeting at which the Pilgrims decided to send Standish and a small group of eight, including Hobbamock, to Wessagusset to kill the leaders of the plot. The mission had a personal aspect for Standish. One of the warriors threatening Wessagusset was Wituwamat, a Neponset who had earlier insulted and threatened Standish. Standish arrived at Wessagusset and found that many of the colonists had gone to live with the Massachusetts, and he ordered them to be called back to Wessagusset. Pecksuot was a Massachusett warrior and leader of the group threatening Wessagusset; he came to the settlement with Wituwamat and other warriors the day after Standish's arrival. Standish claimed simply to be in Wessagusset on a trading mission, but Pecksuot said to Hobbamock, "Let him begin when he dare; he shall not take us unawares." Later in the day, Pecksuot approached Standish, looking down on him, and said, "You are a great captain, yet you are but a little man. Though I be no sachem, yet I am of great strength and courage."

The next day, Standish arranged to meet with Pecksuot over a meal in one of Wessagusset's one-room houses. Pecksuot brought Wituwamat, Wituwamat's adolescent brother, and several women. Standish had three men of Plymouth and Hobbamock with him in the house. On an arranged signal, they shut the door of the house and Standish attacked Pecksuot, stabbing him repeatedly with the man's own knife. Wituwamat and the third warrior were also killed. Standish ordered two more Massachusett warriors to be put to death, then went outside the walls of Wessagusset in search of Obtakiest, a sachem of the Massachusett tribe. They soon encountered Obtakiest with a group of warriors, and a skirmish ensued during which Obtakiest escaped.

Having accomplished his mission, Standish returned to Plymouth with Wituwamat's head. The leaders of the plot to destroy the settlements had been killed and the threat removed, but the action had unexpected consequences. The settlement of Wessagusset, which Standish had been trying to protect, was all but abandoned after the incident. Most of the settlers departed for an English fishing post on Monhegan Island. The attack also caused widespread panic among Indian tribes throughout the region. Villages were abandoned and the Pilgrims had difficulty reviving trade for some time.

Pastor John Robinson was still in Leiden, but he criticized Standish for his brutality. Bradford, too, was uncomfortable with his methods, but he defended him in a letter: "As for Capten Standish, we leave him to answer for him selfe, but this we must say, he is as helpfull an instrument as any we have, and as carefull of the generall good."

=== Dispersal of Merrymount settlers ===
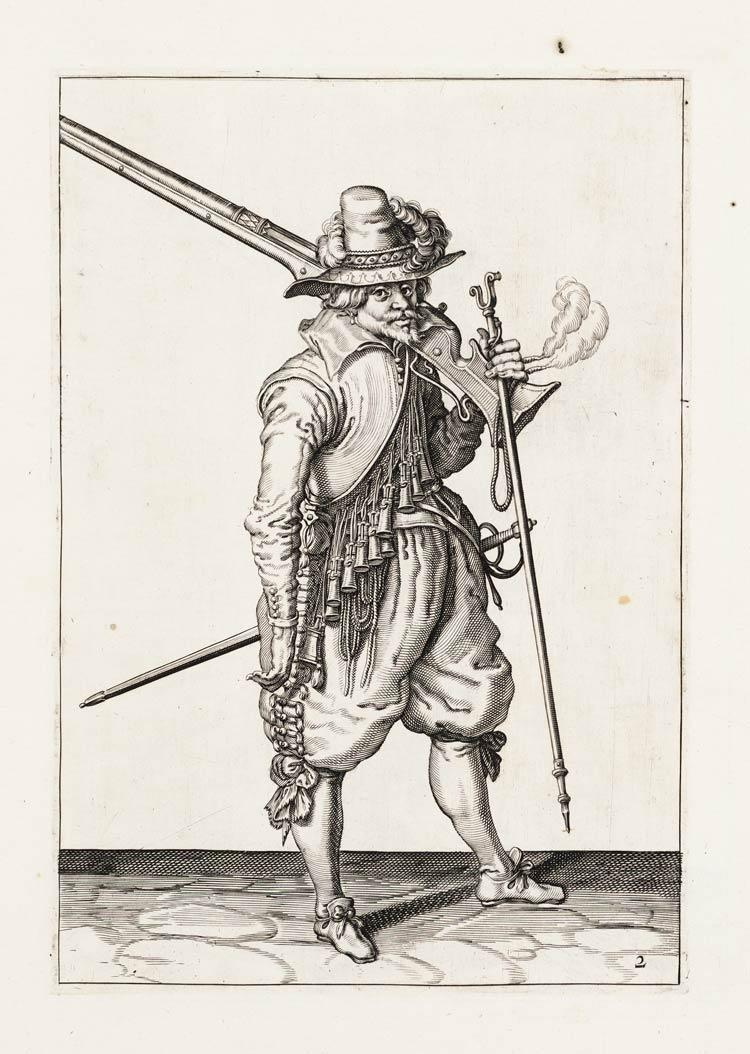
From a 16th-century Dutch manual on the use of the arquebus, a type of matchlock used by the Pilgrims

In 1625, another group of English settlers established an outpost not far from the site of Wessagusset, located in Quincy, Massachusetts, about 27 miles (43 km) north of Plymouth. The settlement was officially known as Mount Wollaston, but soon earned the nickname "Merrymount." Their leader Thomas Morton encouraged behavior that the Pilgrims found objectionable and dangerous. The men of Merrymount built a maypole, drank liberally, refused to observe the Sabbath, and sold weapons to the Indians. Bradford found the weapons sales particularly disturbing and ordered Standish to lead an expedition to arrest Morton in 1628.

Standish arrived with a group of men to find that the small band at Merrymount had barricaded themselves within a small building. Morton eventually decided to attack the men from Plymouth, but the Merrymount group were too drunk to handle their weapons. Morton aimed a weapon at Standish, which the captain ripped from his hands. Standish and his men took Morton to Plymouth and eventually sent him back to England. Later, Morton wrote the book New English Canaan in which he referred to Standish as "Captain Shrimp" and added, "I have found the Massachusetts Indians more full of humanity than the Christians."

=== Penobscot expedition ===
Standish's last significant known expedition was against the French who had established a trading post in 1613 on the Penobscot River in Castine, Maine. English forces captured the settlement in 1628 and turned it over to Plymouth Colony. It was a valuable source of furs and timber for the Pilgrims for seven years. However, the French mounted a small expedition in 1635 and easily reclaimed the settlement. Bradford ordered Standish to take action, determined that the post be reclaimed in Plymouth Colony's name. This was a significantly larger proposition than the small expeditions which Standish had previously led and, to accomplish the task, he chartered the ship Good Hope captained by a man named Girling. Standish's plan appears to have been to bring the Good Hope within cannon range of the trading post and to bombard the French into surrendering. Unfortunately, Girling ordered the bombardment before the ship was within range and quickly spent all the gunpowder on board. Standish gave up the effort.

By this time, the neighboring and more populous Massachusetts Bay Colony had been established. Bradford appealed to leaders of the colony in Boston for help in reclaiming the trading post, but the Bay Colony refused. The incident was indicative of the rivalry which persisted between Plymouth and Massachusetts Bay colonies. In 1691, the two were merged to become the royal Province of Massachusetts Bay.

== Settlement in Duxbury ==
The Alexander Standish House (still standing) purportedly built by Myles Standish's son on the Captain's farm in Duxbury, Massachusetts

In 1625, Plymouth Colony leaders appointed Standish to travel to London to negotiate new terms with the Merchant Adventurers. If a settlement could be reached and the Pilgrims could pay off their debt to the Adventurers, then the colonists would have new rights to allot land and settle where they pleased. Standish was not successful in his negotiations and returned to Plymouth in April 1626. Another effort was successful later in 1626, this time negotiated by Isaac Allerton, and several leading men of Plymouth, including Standish, ultimately paid off the colony's debt to the Adventurers.

The leaders of Plymouth Colony were now free of the directives of the Merchant Adventurers, and they exerted their newfound autonomy by organizing a land division in 1627. Large farm lots were parceled out to each family in the colony along the shore of Plymouth, Kingston, Duxbury, and Marshfield, Massachusetts. Standish received a farm of 120 acres (49 ha) in Duxbury, and he built a house and settled there around 1628.

There are indications that Standish began to seek a quieter life by 1635 (after the Penobscot expedition), maintaining the livestock and fields of his Duxbury farm. He was about 51 years old at that time, and he began to relinquish the responsibility of defending the colony to a younger generation. A note in the colony records of 1635 indicates that Lieutenant William Holmes was appointed to train the militia as Standish's immediate subordinate. When the Pequot War loomed in 1637, Standish was appointed to a committee to raise a company of 30 men, but it was Holmes who led the company in the field.

The families living in Duxbury (sometimes "Duxborough") asked to be set off from Plymouth as a separate town with their own church and minister; this request was granted in 1637. Historian Justin Winsor and others have insisted that the name of Duxbury was given by Standish in honor of Duxbury Hall, near Chorley in Lancashire, which was owned by a branch of the Standish family. The coincidence would suggest that he had something to do with it, though no records exist to indicate how the town was named.

== Last years ==
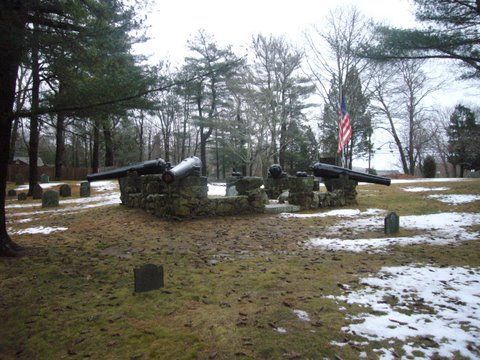
Standish grave site in the Myles Standish Cemetery in Duxbury, Massachusetts

During the 1640s, Standish took on an increasingly administrative role. He served as a surveyor of highways, as treasurer of the colony from 1644 to 1649, and on various committees to lay out boundaries of new towns and inspect waterways. His old friend Hobbamock had been part of his household, but he died in 1642 and was buried on Standish's farm in Duxbury.

Standish died on October 3, 1656, of "strangullion" or strangury, a condition often associated with kidney stones or bladder cancer. He was buried in Duxbury's Old Burying Ground, now known as the Myles Standish Cemetery.

== Marriages and family ==
Myles Standish married:

- Rose (1601–1621) by 1618. She died the first winter. She was buried in an unmarked grave at Coles Hill Burial Ground in Plymouth, as were many others who died the first winter. She is named on the Pilgrim Memorial Tomb on Cole's Hill as "Rose, first wife of Myles Standish".
- Barbara by 1624. She had come to Plymouth in 1623 on the Anne and they were married the following spring. They had seven children. She died after October 6, 1659, and her burial place is unknown.

Children of Myles and Barbara Standish:

1. Charles (1) was born in 1624. He died between May 22, 1627, and 1635.
2. Alexander was born about 1626 and died July 6, 1702. He was buried in Myles Standish Burying Ground in Duxbury, Massachusetts. He married Sarah Alden by 1660 and had eight children. She died before June 13, 1688. Her father was Mayflower passenger John Alden. He then married Desire (Doty) (Sherman) Holmes by 1689 and had three children. She died in Marshfield on January 22, 1731. Her father was Mayflower passenger Edward Doty.
3. John was born about 1627. No further record exists.
4. Myles was born about 1629 and died at sea after March 20, 1661. His body was lost at sea. He married Sarah Winslow, a daughter of John Winslow and Mary Chilton, in Boston on July 19, 1660, but there is no record of children.
5. Loara (Lora) was born on May 22, 1627, in Plymouth Mass, and died by March 7, 1655. She married Abraham Samson (32) in 1646 when she was 19 years old and had seven children; Nathaniel Samson, Abraham Samson, Miles Samson, Rebecca Samson, Ebenezer Samson, Sarah Samson, and Grace Samson.
6. Josiah was born about 1633 and died in Preston, Connecticut, on March 19, 1690. His burial place is unknown. He married Mary Dingley in Marshfield on December 19, 1654, who died in Duxbury on July 1, 1655. He married Sarah Allen after 1655 and had eight children. She died after September 16, 1690.
7. Charles (2) was born by about 1635. He was still living on March 7, 1655/1656. No further record exists.

== Legacy ==
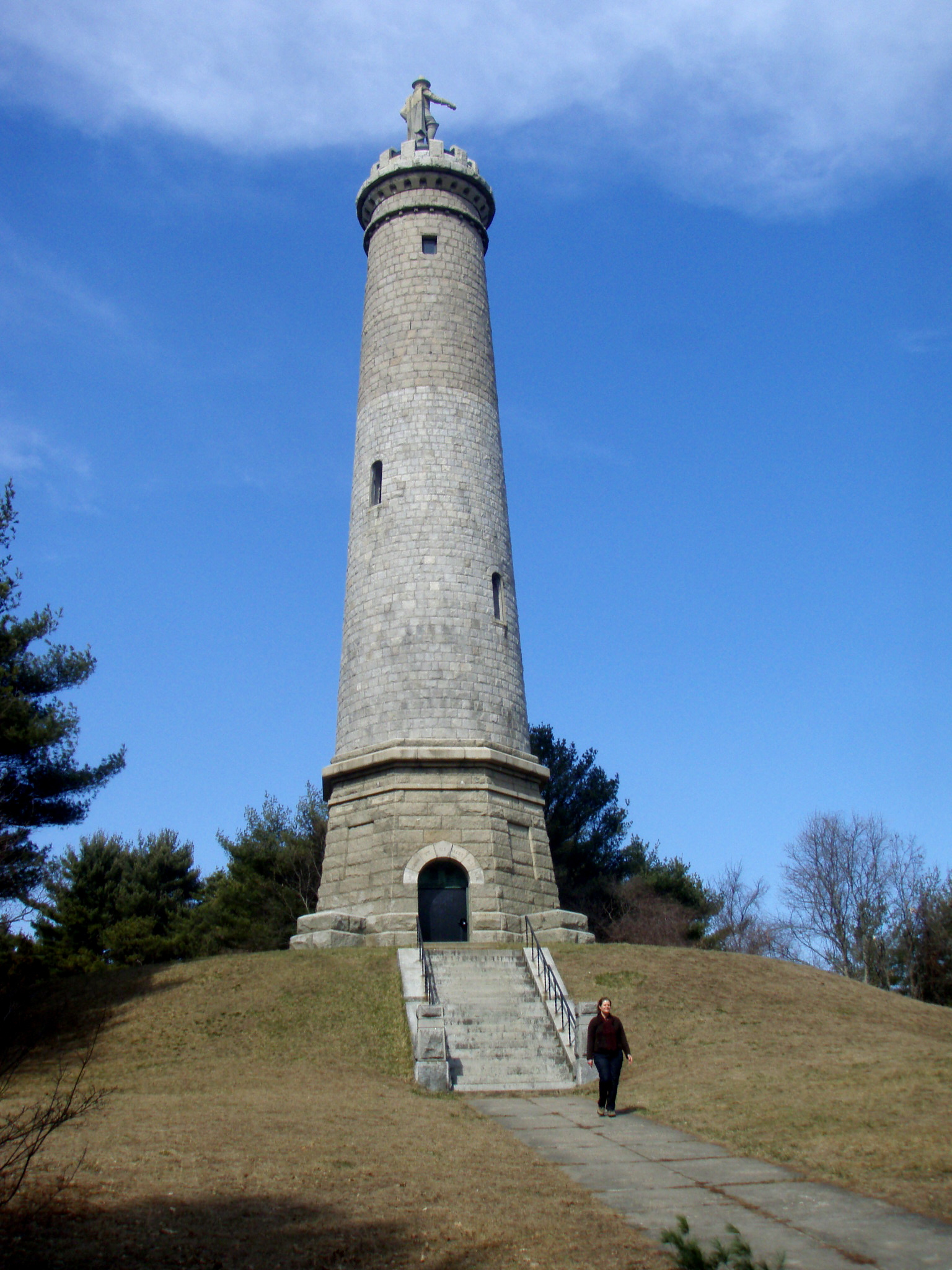
Myles Standish Monument in Duxbury, Massachusetts

Standish's true-life role in defending Plymouth Colony and the sometimes brutal tactics that he employed were largely obscured by the fictionalized character created by Henry Wadsworth Longfellow in his narrative poem The Courtship of Miles Standish. Historian Tudor Jenks wrote that Longfellow's book had "no claim to be considered other than a pleasant little fairystory, and as an entirely misleading sketch of men and matters in old Plymouth." However, the book elevated Standish to the level of folk hero in Victorian America. In late 19th century Duxbury, the book generated a movement to build monuments in Standish's honor, a beneficial byproduct of which was increased tourism to the town.

The first of these monuments was the largest. The cornerstone was laid for the Myles Standish Monument in Duxbury in 1872, with a crowd of ten thousand people attending the ceremonies. It was finished in 1898, and is the third tallest monument to an individual in the United States. It is surpassed only by the first dedicated Washington Monument (178 feet (54 m)) in Baltimore, Maryland (finished in 1829) and the Washington Monument (555 feet (169 m)) in Washington, D.C. (dedicated in 1885). The top of the monument is 116 feet (35 m) overall, and at the top stands a 14-foot (4.3 m) statue of Standish.

A second, smaller monument was placed over the alleged site of Standish's grave in 1893. Two exhumations of Standish's remains were undertaken in 1889 and 1891 to determine the location of his resting place. A third exhumation took place in 1930 to place his remains in a hermetically sealed chamber beneath the gravesite monument. His burial site is located in Myles Standish Burial Ground in Duxbury.

The site of Standish's house reveals only a slight depression in the ground where the cellar hole was, but it is now a small park owned and maintained by the town of Duxbury. Standish, Maine is named for him, as well as the neighborhood of Standish, Minneapolis. At least two forts were named after him: an earthen fort on Plymouth's Saquish Neck built during the American Civil War, and a larger cement fort built on Lovells Island in Boston Harbor in 1895. Both forts are now abandoned. Camp Myles Standish in nearby Taunton was also named for him.

Myles Standish State Forest is located in the towns of Plymouth and Carver in southeastern Massachusetts, approximately 45 miles (70 km) south of Boston. It is the largest publicly owned recreation area in this part of Massachusetts, and is managed by the Department of Conservation and Recreation (DCR). Myles Standish Hall is a dormitory at Boston University, originally constructed as the Myles Standish Hotel in 1925. In 2024, Boston University removed Standish's name from the building, citing his brutality.

In 2020, Chorley in Lancashire commemorated 400 years of Myles Standish's Pilgrim journey. However, many elements of its planned year were postponed due to the COVID-19 outbreak.
