= Pecksuot =

Massachusett war leader (d. c. 1623)

Pecksuot (died c. 1623) was a warrior of a Massachusett tribe led by Chickatawbut in the early 17th century until his death c. 1623. He was killed by Myles Standish either in 1624 in the battle at Wessagusset Colony (citation irretrievable) as immortalized in Henry Wadsworth Longfellow's poem The Courtship of Miles Standish or, more probably, during a dinner arranged by Standish in 1623.
