= Succonet =

Succonet were a tribe of Native Americans living near modern Falmouth, Massachusetts in the 1620s.

== See also ==
- Native American tribes in Massachusetts
