= Wetu =

Domed hut used by some north-eastern Native American tribes

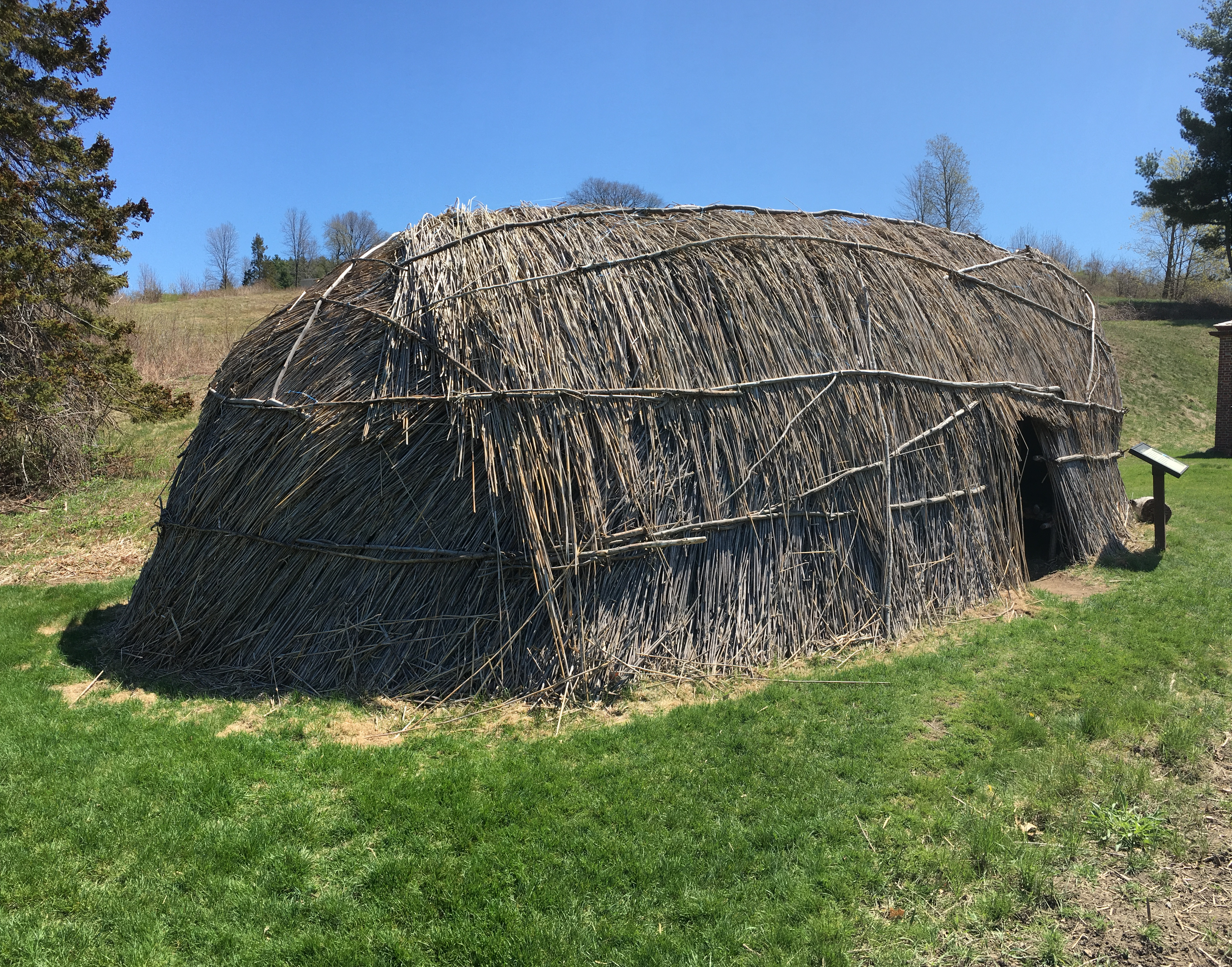
Wetu recreation at Fruitlands Museum

A wetu is a domed hut, used by some north-eastern Native American tribes such as the Wampanoag. They provided shelter, sometimes seasonal or temporary, for families near the wooded coast for hunting and fishing. They were made out of sticks of a red cedar frame covered with either tree bark or mats made from grass or reeds.
