= Pniese =

Elite warriors of the Algonquin people

The pniese (/ˈniːs/ or /pəˈniːs/) were elite warriors of the Pokanoket tribe of the Wamponoag - in seventeenth-century New England. They "were warriors of special abilities and stamina (it was said a pniese could not be killed in battle) who were responsible collecting tribute for his sachem." Historian Nathaniel Philbrick names Hobbamock of the Pokanokets, and one of sachem Massasoit's men, as pnieses.

According to Philbrick, both Hobbamock and Squanto (the shortened name for Tisquntum) were named after Indian spirits of darkness. Squanto has a prominent place in the founding history of Plymouth Plantation.

While Philbrick specifically mentions Squanto as not being a pniese, an article by Charles C. Mann in The Smithsonian Magazine implies that he was, and gives information about pniese training. The training was more rigorous than that of his friends, "for it seems that he was selected to become a pniese, a kind of counselor-bodyguard to the sachem." Pniese were expected to learn the art of ignoring pain, by, for instance, "running barelegged through brambles," and by fasting, "to learn self-discipline. After spending their winter in the woods, pniese candidates came back to an additional test: drinking bitter gentian juice until they vomited, repeating this process over and over."
