= Thomas Weston (merchant adventurer) =

English merchant adventurer (1584–c. 1647)

- Born: 1584; Staffordshire, England
- Died: 1647 (aged 62–63)
- Occupation: Merchant

Thomas Weston (1584 – c. 1647) was a London merchant who first became involved with the Leiden Separatists who settled Plymouth Colony in 1620 and became known as the Pilgrims.

== Early life ==
Weston was baptized on December 21, 1584, at Rugeley, Staffordshire, England. He was the son of Ralph Weston and Anne Smith. He was admitted to the Ironmongers Company of London in 1609

== Career ==
In 1615, he persuaded Edward Pickering to become his agent in Holland and together they began to import a variety of nonconformist religious tracts that were seditious. In 1619, he and his agent Philomen Powell began importing tons of alum for which they did not pay custom duties. He and some of his associate Merchant Adventurers had been brought before the Privy Council and ordered to cease unlimited trade in the Netherlands. Soon after, he left England and travelled to Leiden, Holland, where his agent Pickering had married a Puritan woman belonging to a group of separatists who were in exile due to their religious views; these Puritans were hoping to gain passage to America.

Weston became involved with the Leiden Separatists who left England aboard the Mayflower and settled Plymouth colony in 1620. The colony was financed and begun under his direction, but he quit the enterprise in 1622. Among this company was Phineas Pratt, who later wrote an account of the company's experience in Wessagusset.

As agent for the merchant adventurers' investment in the Mayflower voyage, Weston played an instrumental part in the incident of the More children of Shropshire, who had been taken from their mother's home in 1616 in a dispute centering on her supposed adultery. The children had been held in Shropshire for four years and then taken to Weston and held at his home in Aldgate, London, for some weeks until the Mayflower was to sail. The children were then given over to the custody of three senior Pilgrim officials for the voyage to the New World. Three of the four children died the first bitter winter in Plymouth. Only Richard More survived.

== Marriage and children ==
Thomas Weston married Elizabeth Weaver by October 17, 1623. She was a daughter of Christopher Weaver and Anne Green. He had one child, Elizabeth Weston, born about 1630. She married Roger Conant before January 22, 1661/2, and had two children. He died in June 1672. Child of Thomas and Elizabeth Weston:

- Elizabeth, born about 1630. She married Roger Conant Jr. son of Roger Conant before January 22, 1661/2. They had two children. Roger Conant died in June 1672.

== Later years ==
In early 1622, he began the colony of Wessagusset which failed by March 1623. He left New England for Virginia, and by 1640, Maryland. Weston's activities in regard to the Plymouth colony are detailed in William Bradford's history - "So, Mr. Weston had come hither again, and afterward shaped his course for Virginia, and so for the present I shall leave him."

Thomas Weston often figures in William Bradford's "History" and Robert Cushman's letters. He was an Adventurer (or Merchant Adventurer), promoter and capitalist, and being a citizen and ironmonger of London. One derogatory comment recorded about him from records of the time was that: He was eager to reap quick profits from the New World, and not very scrupulous about the means.

On March 1, 1622, Weston was to deliver a cannon to the Council of New England but sold it instead to a Turkish pirate and pocketed the money. Weston was declared an outlaw from the Crown. On May 31, 1622, the Council for New England ordered the forfeiture of Weston's ships and did so immediately.

According to C.M. Andrews in the book Colonial Period, these remarks were recorded about Weston: "Weston, after squeezing all he could out of the Pilgrims, became a planter and burgess in Virginia, where he made trading and fishing voyages to the Maine coast. After being arrested more than once for breaking the Colony's laws, he went to Maryland, acquired new property, and returned to England.

== Death ==
He died in London of the plague between May 5, 1647 and November 29, 1648. He was presumably still alive when William Barwick of Bristol deposed that Weston had come to London in June 1645 on the ship Trewlove, and also before November 23, 1647 when Christopher Weaver allowed a generous bequest to his daughter, the widow Elizabeth Weston, for "her better advancement in marriage." William Bradford recorded: "He died afterwards at Bristol, in the time of the wars, of the sickness in that place."
