= Pokanoket =

Native American village and 17th c. Native American political division

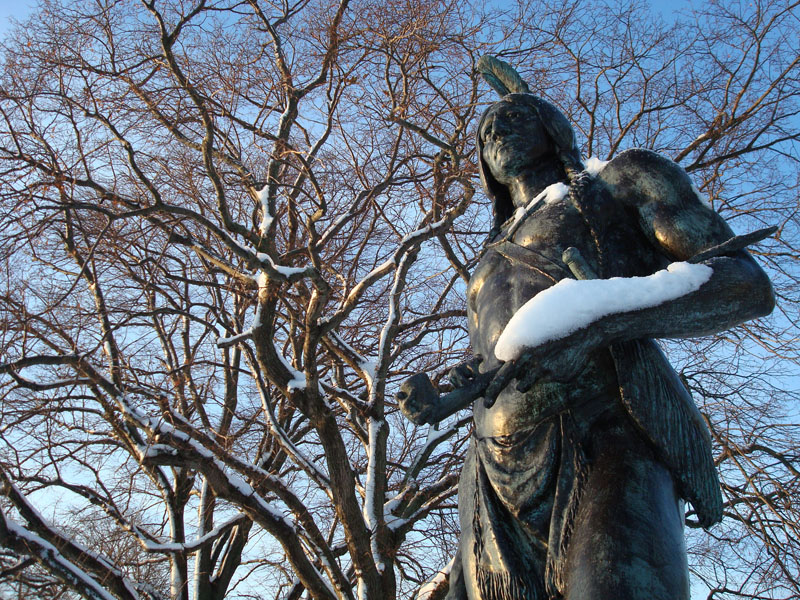
- Statue of Massasoit, or Ousamequin (17th-century Pokanoket leader), in Plymouth

Total population
- defunct

Regions with significant populations
- Massachusetts, Rhode Island

Languages
- Wampanoag

Religion
- Indigenous religion, Christianity

Related ethnic groups
- other Wampanoag people

The Pokanoket (also spelled Pakanokick) are a group of Wampanoag people and the village governed by Massasoit (c. 1581–1661), chief sachem of the Wampanoag people.

The village was located on what is now called Mount Hope in Bristol, Rhode Island. Later the term Pokanoket broadened to refer to the peoples and lands governed by Massasoit and his successors, which were part of the Wampanoag people in what is now Rhode Island and Massachusetts.

== Name ==
Pokanoket is also spelled Pauquunaukit, and translates as "land at the clearing" from the Massachusett.

== History ==
At the time of the pilgrims' arrival in Plymouth, the realm of Pokanoket included parts of Rhode Island and much of southeastern Massachusetts. European accounts of Pokanoket social life noted the political authority of the Massasoit (Great Leader).

The realm of the Pokanoket was extensive and known to the Pilgrims before they arrived at Plymouth, Massachusetts on the Mayflower in 1620. William Bradford wrote that he had received before the Pilgrims sailed: "The Pokanokets, which live to the west of Plymouth, bear an inveterate malice to the English, and are of more strength than all the savages from there to Penobscot. Their desire of revenge was occasioned by an English man who, having many of them on board, made a great slaughter with their murderers and small shot, when (as they say) they offered no injury on their part."

The area in Rhode Island consisting of Bristol, Barrington, and Warren (the latter named Sowams by the natives) was the main settlement of the Pokanoket when the Pilgrims arrived. Bradford had been told that the land of the Pokanoket had "the richest soil, and much open ground fit for English grain".

Giovanni da Verrazzano sailed into Narragansett Bay in 1524, and people appeared on the shores, most likely Pokanokets. The navigator's recorded latitude of 41°40′ north corresponds to Mount Hope Bay, where the seat of the Pokanoket is located. Verrazzano wrote of these Rhode Island Native Americans whom he encountered: "These people are the most beautiful and have the most civil customs we have found on this voyage."

The Pilgrims lost more than half of their people due to sickness and starvation over the first winter. The Pokanoket taught them how to plant crops and live in this country. Despite the fears initially felt by the Pilgrims, the Pokanoket quickly made a pact of peace with the new settlers. Bradford referred to the Pokanoket leader Ousamequin as "their great Sachem, called Massasoit". Ousamequin was succeeded as Great Leader of the Pokanoket by his sons, first by Wamsutta, (also known as Alexander), and then by Metacomet (also known as Philip), who was killed in the King Philip's War (1675–76).

Natick, sometimes referred to as Pokanoket, is the dialect of Massachusett spoken among the Pokanoket.

== List of Pokanoket leaders ==
Sachem	From	To
Massasoit Wasanegin	1525	1577
Massasoit Ousamequin	1581	1661
Massasoit Wamsutta (English name "Alexander")	1661	1662
Massasoit Metacomet (English name "Philip")	1662	1676

== Historical territories ==
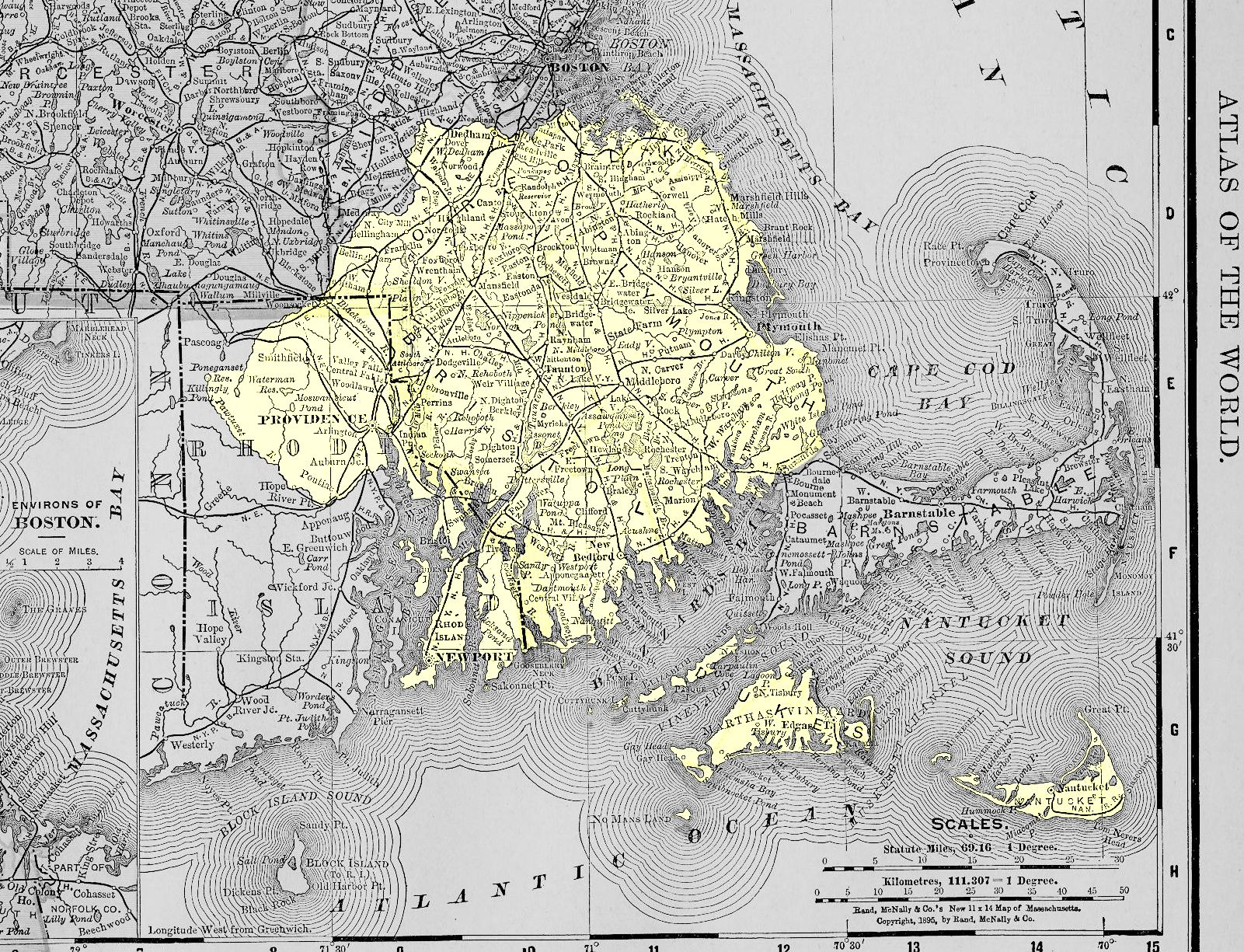

The Pokanoket's conceded territory shown in the map featured here is a reconstruction of Pokanoket ancestral boundaries based on a political and topographical map from 1895, which itself drew on 17th-century topographical descriptions of political borders.

Today, the area includes cities and towns on the Massachusetts and Rhode Island border such as Bristol, Warren, Barrington, East Providence, Seekonk, Rehoboth, Attleboro, Lakeville,Cumberland, North Attleboro, Norton, Mansfield, Dighton, and Somerset.

== Map points ==
1. Both the Seller Map and the Hack Map document Pokanoket ancestral land to the east and west of the head of what is now called Narragansett Bay.
2. Pokanoket used rivers as boundaries for their ancestral lands due to the natural geographical features of their area. On the west side of the bay, the boundary starts in the land that is called Cowessett ( Cowee means pines. Cowessett Place of Pines ) (Land at the border). The Pawtuxet River is the natural boundary that defines the border between the Narragansett and Pokanoket Tribes. Narragansett lands are to the south of the Pawtuxet River.
3. Pokanoket lands lie to the north and northeast of the Pawtuxet River as far north as the Ponegunsett Reservoir, then continue northeast of the Ponegunsett Reservoir, northward up the Chepachet River.
4. The Nipmuc lands are west and northwest of the Chepachet River. East of this river is Pokanoket lands.
5. We now follow the Charles River from its basin northeasterly until it empties into Boston Bay. The lands to the west of the Charles River are Nipmuc lands. The lands to the east are Pokanoket lands.
6. The lands north of the Charles River are Massachusetts lands and the lands south of the Charles River are Pokanoket lands.
7. The eastern mainland boundary of Pokanoket is located at what is now the Cape Cod Canal, which was once a tributary extended from Great Herring Pond. West of this border is Pokanoket land. East of this natural border is the land of the Nausett.
8. This leaves the islands in what we now call Narragansett Bay and the islands off the coast. All the islands in Narragansett Bay on this map are highlighted except for Jamestown and Dutch Island. These two islands belong to the Narragansett, as well as Block Island located in Rhode Island Sound.

== Descendants ==
Today, descendants of the historic Pokanoket people are represented through multiple Indigenous communities, including the Mashpee Wampanoag Tribe, a federally recognized tribe in Massachusetts, as well as the contemporary Pokanoket Tribe, which identifies as descended from the historic Pokanoket people and maintains community ties in Rhode Island and southeastern Massachusetts.Lindahl, Chris (13 May 2017). "R.I. tribe protests repatriation ceremony". Cape Cod Times.

The contemporary Pokanoket Tribe is not federally recognized or formally state recognized as a tribe.Indian Affairs Bureau (29 January 2021). "Indian Entities Recognized by and Eligible To Receive Services From the United States Bureau of Indian Affairs". Federal Register. 86 (18): 7554–7558."State Recognized Tribes". National Conference of State Legislatures. However, the Pokanoket people have received increasing public and institutional acknowledgment in recent years. In 2025, the Rhode Island Senate passed Resolution S1034 recognizing the Pokanoket as the “ancient and ongoing stewards of their ancestral homeland,” while several East Bay municipalities have adopted land acknowledgments recognizing Pokanoket history and presence in the region."Senate Resolution Supporting the Recognition of the Pokanoket Tribe as the Ancient and Ongoing Stewards of Their Ancestral Homeland". Rhode Island General Assembly. 7 May 2025.Farzan, Antonia Noori (31 December 2021). "3 Rhode Island towns adopt 'land acknowledgements' honoring Native American tribes". The Providence Journal.

In 2024, Brown University transferred approximately 255 acres at Mount Hope (Montaup) in Bristol to a preservation trust established by the Pokanoket Tribe, acknowledging the site's importance as ancestral Pokanoket land and the historic home of Metacom (King Philip).St. Germain, Patricia (2 December 2024). "Brown University transfers portion of Mount Hope land to Pokanoket Tribe". Associated Press.
