= Corbitant =

- Coubatant, Caunbitant

Pocasset Wampanoag leader

Personal details
- Children: Weetamoo
- Known for: Opposition to the English, and to Squanto; ally of Massasoit

Corbitant was a Wampanoag sachem under Massasoit. Corbitant was the sachem of the Pocasset tribe in present-day North Tiverton, Rhode Island, c. 1618–1630. He lived in Mattapuyst or Mattapoiset, located in the southern part of today's Swansea, Massachusetts.

In the summer of 1621, he was involved in a minor altercation with the Plymouth Colony involving the Patuxet refugee Tisquantum ("Squanto") at present-day Middleborough, Massachusetts. Corbitant had menaced both Tisquantum and his companion Hobbamock for their close ties with the white settlers. Fearing for their lives, Habbamock was able to escape and run back to Plymouth, where he rallied the pilgrims under Miles Standish. Standish led ten armed men of Plymouth to rescue Tisquantum from Corbitant. They attacked the Wampanoag village at Nemasket, but by that time Corbitant had released Squanto and withdrawn from the area. Corbitant was nominally obedient to the Great Sachem Massasoit of the Pokanoket. Although described as a "determined foe of the English", nonetheless, "with other hostile chiefs he signed a treaty of peace with the English in 1621."

Tribes of the Wampanoag federation possessed hunting grounds at Cape Cod, Plymouth, Taunton, Attleboro, Middleborough, Hanson, Duxbury, Freetown, Somerset, Swansea, Mattapoisett, Wareham, and Fall River, in Massachusetts, as well as Tiverton, Aquidneck Island (Newport), Conanicut Island, Little Compton, Bristol, Warren and the lands west to the Providence River. Around the year 1622, the Narragansett Federation under Canonicus seized Conanicut Island of present-day Jamestown from Massasoit.
