= Squanto =

Native American contact of the Pilgrims

Tisquantum ("Squanto")
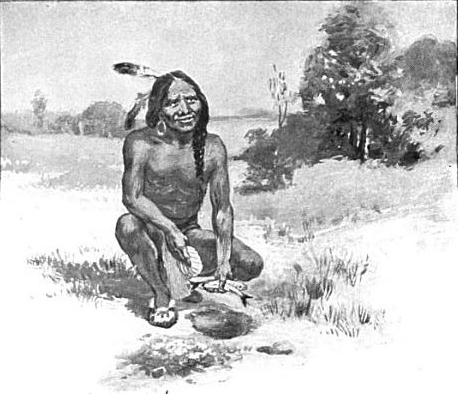
- 1911 illustration of Tisquantum ("Squanto") teaching the Plymouth colonists to plant maize
- Born: c. 1580; Patuxet (now Plymouth, Massachusetts)
- Died: November 30, 1622 O.S. (aged 44); Mamamoycke (or Monomoit) (now Chatham, Massachusetts)
- Known for: Guidance, advice, and translation services to the Mayflower settlers

Tisquantum (/tɪsˈkwɒntəm/; c. 1585 (±10 years?) – November 30, 1622 O.S.), more commonly known as Squanto (/ˈskwɒntoʊ/), was a member of the Patuxet tribe of Wampanoags, best known for being an early liaison between the Native American population in Southern New England and the Mayflower Pilgrims who made their settlement at the site of Tisquantum's former summer village, now Plymouth, Massachusetts.

In 1614, Tisquantum was kidnapped by English sea captain Thomas Hunt, who trafficked him to Spain, selling him in the city of Málaga. He and several other captives were said to have been ransomed by local Franciscan friars who focused on the captives' education and evangelization. Having learned English during his captivity, he eventually travelled to England and managed to find a way back across the Atlantic. He arrived back to his native village in America in 1619, only to find that he had become the last of the Patuxet, as his tribe had been wiped out by epidemic; so he then went to live with the Wampanoags.

The Mayflower landed in Cape Cod Bay in 1620, and Tisquantum worked to broker peaceable relations between the Pilgrims and the local Pokanokets. He played a crucial role in the early meetings in March 1621, partly because he could speak English. He then lived with the Pilgrims for 20 months as an interpreter, guide, and advisor. He introduced the settlers to the fur trade and taught them how to sow and fertilize native crops; this proved vital because the seeds the Pilgrims had brought from England mostly failed. As food shortages worsened, Plymouth Colony governor William Bradford relied on Tisquantum to pilot a ship of settlers on a trading expedition around Cape Cod and through dangerous shoals. During that voyage, Tisquantum contracted what Bradford called an "Indian fever". Bradford stayed with him for several days until he died, which Bradford described as a "great loss".

== Name ==
Documents from the 17th century variously render the spelling of Tisquantum's name as Tisquantum, Tasquantum, and Tusquantum, and alternately call him Squanto, Squantum, Tantum, and Tantam. Even the two Mayflower settlers who dealt with him closely spelled his name differently; Bradford nicknamed him "Squanto", while Edward Winslow invariably referred to him as Tisquantum, which historians believe was his proper name. One suggestion of the meaning is that it is derived from the Algonquian expression for the rage of the Manitou, "the world-suffusing spiritual power at the heart of coastal Indians' religious beliefs". Manitou was "the spiritual potency of an object" or "a phenomenon", the force which made "everything in Nature responsive to man". Other suggestions have been offered, (Note: Kinnicutt proposes meanings for the various renderings of his name: Squantam, a contracted form of Musquantum meaning "He is angry"; Tantum is a shortened form of Keilhtannittoom, meaning "My great god"; Tanto, from Kehtanito, for "He is the greatest god": and Tisquantam, for Atsquantam, possibly for "He possesses the god of evil.") but all involve some relationship to beings or powers that the colonists associated with the devil or evil. (Note: Dockstader writes that Tiquantum means "door" or "entrance", although his source is not explained.) It is, therefore, unlikely that it was his birth name rather than one that he acquired or assumed later in life, but there is no historical evidence on this point. The name may suggest, for example, that he underwent special spiritual and military training and was selected for his role as liaison with the settlers in 1620 for that reason.

== Early life ==
Almost nothing is known of Tisquantum's life before his first contact with Europeans, and even when and how that first encounter took place is subject to contradictory assertions. First-hand descriptions of him written between 1618 and 1622 do not remark on his youth or old age, and Salisbury has suggested that he was in his twenties or thirties when he was captured and taken to Spain in 1614. If that was the case, he would have been born around 1585 (±10 years).

=== Native culture ===
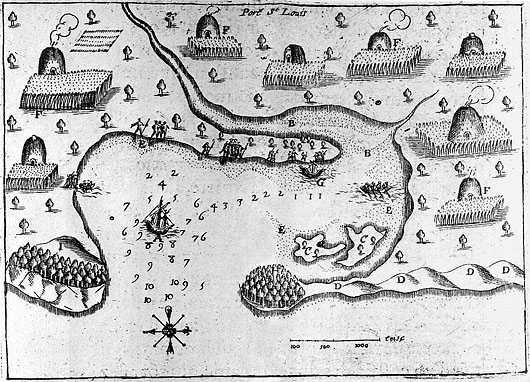
1605 map drawn by Samuel de Champlain of Plymouth Harbor (which he called Port St. Louis); "F" designates wigwams and cultivated fields.

The tribes who lived in southern New England at the beginning of the 17th century referred to themselves as Ninnimissinuok, a variation of the Narragansett word Ninnimissinnȗwock meaning "people" and signifying "familiarity and shared identity". Tisquantum's tribe of the Patuxets occupied the coastal area west of Cape Cod Bay, and he told an English trader that the Patuxets once numbered 2,000. They spoke a dialect of Eastern Algonquian common to tribes as far west as Narragansett Bay. (Note: The languages of Southern New England are known today as Western Abenaki, Massachusett, Loup A and Loup B, Narragansett, Mohegan-Pequot, and Quiripi-Unquachog. Many 17th-century writers state that numerous people in the coastal areas of Southern New England were fluent in two or more of these languages.) The various Algonquian dialects of Southern New England were sufficiently similar to allow effective communications. (Note: Roger Williams writes in his grammar of the Narragansett language that "their Dialects doe exceedingly differ" between the French settlements in Canada and the Dutch settlements in New York, "but (within that compass) a man may, by this helpe, converse with thousands of Natives all over the Countrey.") The term patuxet refers to the site of Plymouth, Massachusetts, and means "at the little falls" (Note: Adolf,) referencing Morison. Morison gives Mourt's Relation as authority for both assertions.

The annual growing season in southern Maine and Canada was not long enough to produce maize harvests. Indian tribes in those areas were required to live a fairly nomadic existence, while the southern New England Algonquins were "sedentary cultivators" by contrast. They grew enough for their own winter needs and for trade, especially to northern tribes, and enough to relieve the colonists' distress for many years when their harvests were insufficient.

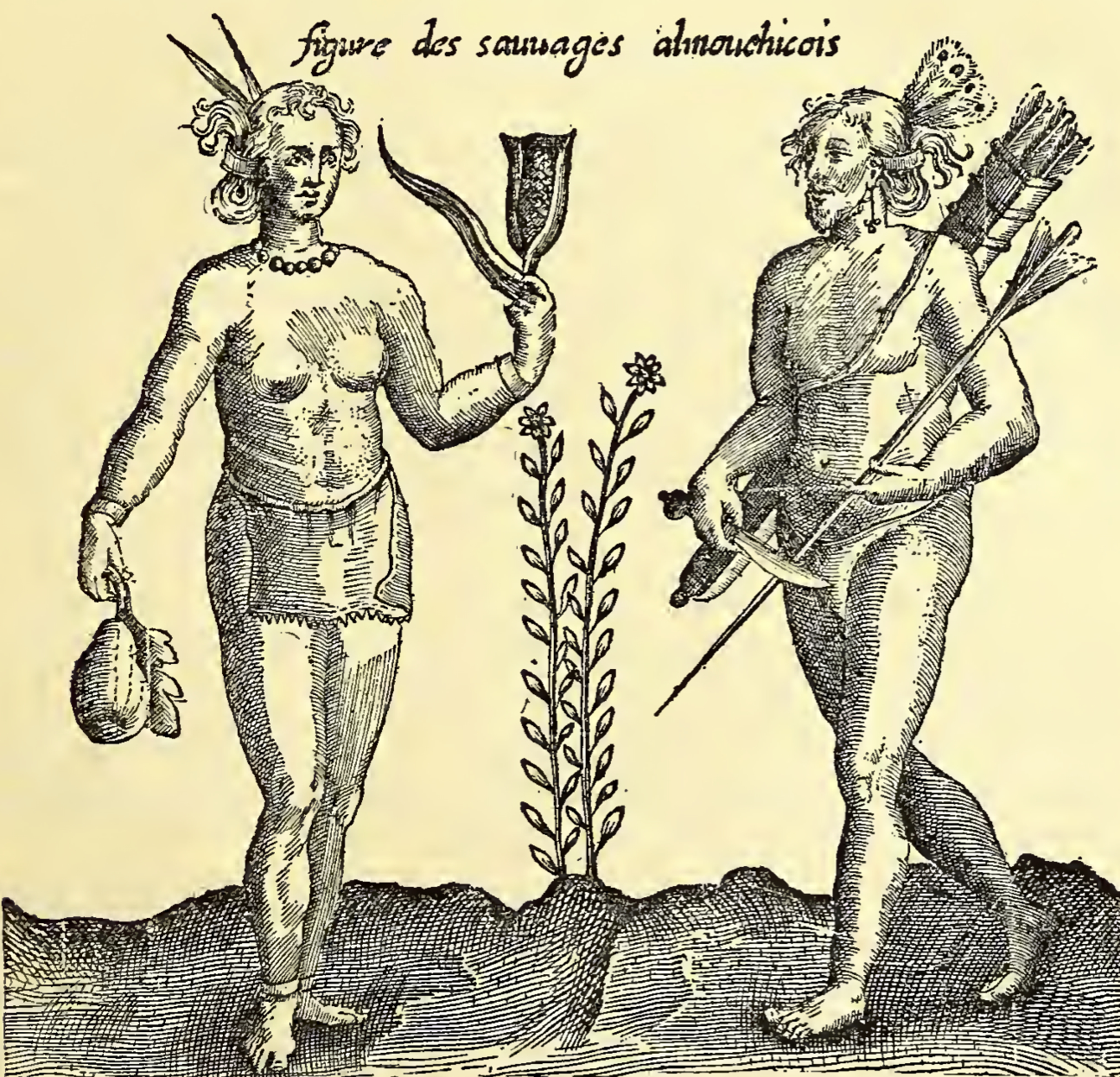
Champlain's idealized drawing of Southern New England Algonquians

The groups that made up the Ninnimissinuok were presided over by one or two sachems. The chief functions of the sachems were to allocate land for cultivation, to manage the trade with other sachems or more distant tribes, to dispense justice (including capital punishment), to collect and store tribute from harvests and hunts, and to lead in war.

Sachems were advised by "principal men" of the community called ahtaskoaog, generally called "nobles" by the colonists. Sachems achieved consensus through the consent of these men, who probably also were involved in the selection of new sachems. One or more principal men were generally present when sachems ceded land. There was a class called the pniesesock among the Pokanokets which collected the annual tribute to the sachem, led warriors into battle, and had a special relationship with their god Abbomocho (Hobbomock) who was invoked in pow wows for healing powers, a force that the colonists equated with the devil. (Note: Winslow called this supernatural being Hobbamock (the Indians north of the Pokanokets call it Hobbamoqui, he said) and expressly equated him with the devil. William Wood called this same supernatural being Abamacho and said that it presided over the infernal regions where "loose livers" were condemned to dwell after death. Winslow used the term powah to refer to the shaman who conducted the healing ceremony, and Wood described these ceremonies in detail.) The priest class came from this order, and the shamans also acted as orators, giving them political power within their societies. Salisbury has suggested that Tisquantum was a pniesesock. This class may have produced something of a praetorian guard, equivalent to the "valiant men" described by Roger Williams among the Narragansetts, the only Southern New England society with an elite class of warriors. In addition to the class of commoners (sanops), there were outsiders who attached themselves to a tribe. They had few rights except the expectation of protection against any common enemy.

== Contact with Europeans ==
The Ninnimissinuok had sporadic contact with European explorers for nearly a century before the landing of the Mayflower in 1620. The fishermen off the Newfoundland banks from Bristol, Normandy, and Brittany began making annual spring visits beginning as early as 1581 to bring cod to Southern Europe. These early encounters had long-term effects. Europeans very likely introduced diseases (Note: Paleopathological evidence exists for European importation of typhoid, diphtheria, influenza, measles, chicken pox, whooping cough, tuberculosis, yellow fever, scarlet fever, gonorrhea and smallpox.) for which the Indian population had no resistance. When the Mayflower arrived, the Pilgrims discovered that an entire village was devoid of inhabitants. European fur traders traded goods with different tribes, and this exacerbated intertribal rivalries and hostilities.

=== First kidnappings ===
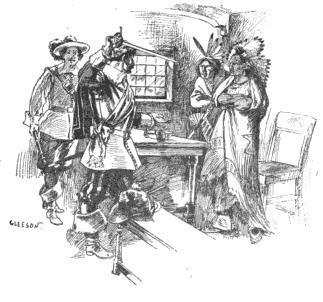
Captain Weymouth impressing Natives of Pemaquid, Maine, with a sword he magnetized by means of a lodestone.

In 1605, George Weymouth set out on an expedition to explore the possibility of settlement in upper New England, sponsored by Henry Wriothesley and Thomas Arundell. They had a chance encounter with a hunting party, then decided to kidnap a number of Indians. The capture of Indians was "a matter of great importance for the full accomplement of our voyage".

They took five captives to England and gave three to Sir Ferdinando Gorges. Gorges was an investor in the Weymouth voyage and became the chief promoter of the scheme when Arundell withdrew from the project. Gorges wrote of his delight in Weymouth's kidnapping, and named Tisquantum as one of the three given to him.

Captain George Weymouth, having failed at finding a Northwest Passage, happened into a River on the Coast of America, called Pemmaquid, from whence he brought five of the Natives, three of whose names were Manida, Sellwarroes, and Tasquantum, whom I seized upon, they were all of one Nation, but of severall parts, and severall Families; This accident must be acknowledged the meanes under God of putting on foote, and giving life to all our Plantations.

However, it is unlikely that the "Tasquantum" identified by Gorges refers to the same man. Circumstantial evidence makes this nearly impossible. The Indians taken by Weymouth and given to Gorges were Eastern Abenaki from Maine, whereas Tisquantum was Patuxet, a Southern New England Algonquin. He lived in Plymouth, and the Archangel did not sail that far south on the voyage of 1605. Adams maintains that "it is not supposable that a member of the Pokánoket [Patuxet] tribe would be passing the summer of 1605 in a visit among his deadly enemies the Tarratines, whose language was not even intelligible to him ... and be captured as one of a party of them in the way described by Rosier." No modern historian entertains this supposition. (Note: See, e.g., Salisbury 1982, pp. 265–66 n.15; Shuffelton 1976, p. 109; Adolf 1964, p. 247; Adams 1892, p. 24 n. 2; Deane 1885, p. 37; Kinnicutt 1914, pp. 109–11)

=== Abduction ===
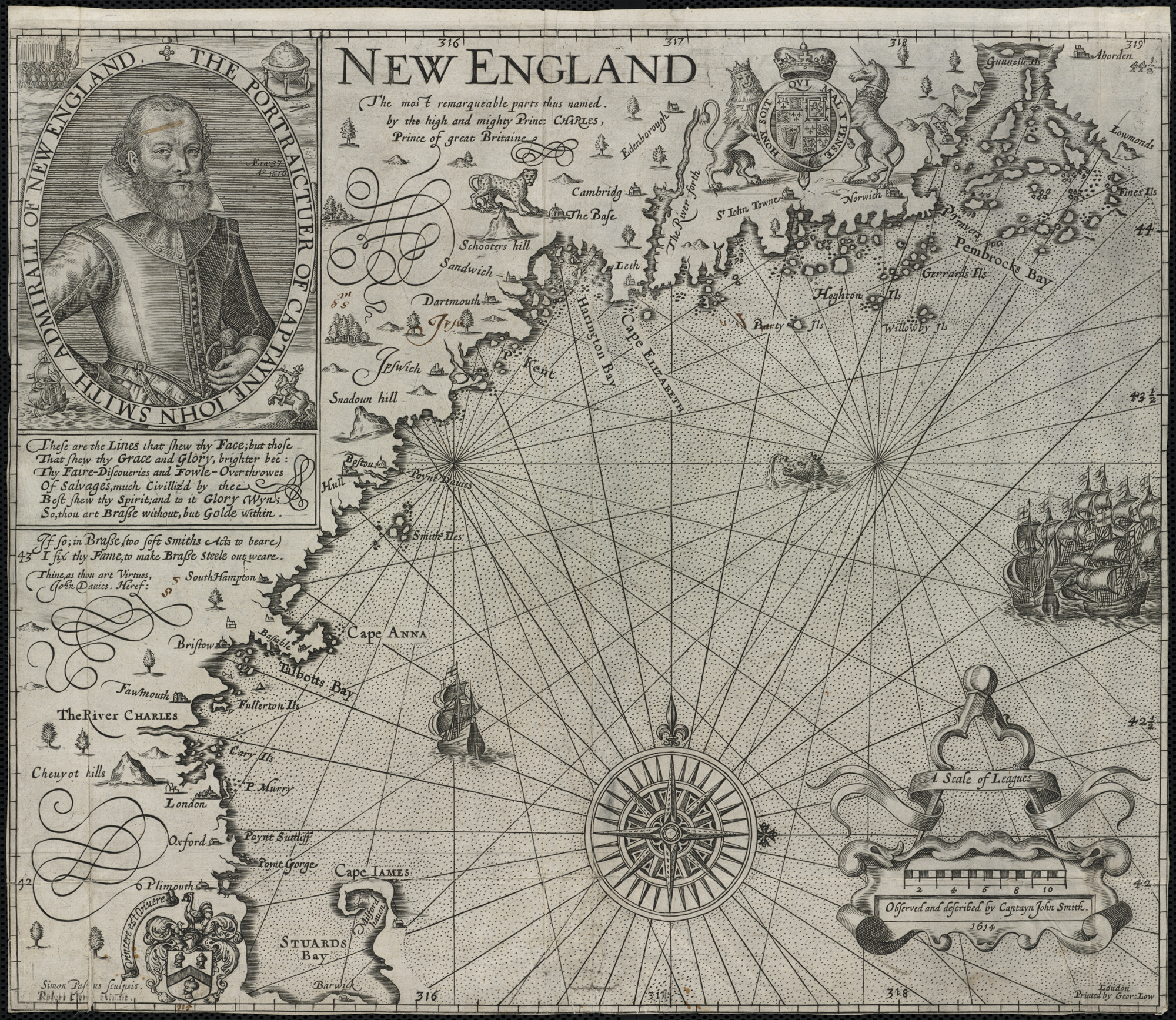
John Smith's 1614 Map of New England.

In 1614, an English expedition headed by John Smith sailed along the coast of Maine and Massachusetts Bay collecting fish and furs. Smith returned to England in one of the vessels and left Thomas Hunt in command of the second ship. Hunt was to complete the haul of cod and proceed to Málaga, Spain, where there was a market for dried fish, but Hunt decided to enhance the value of his shipment by adding human cargo. He sailed to Plymouth harbor ostensibly to trade with the village of Patuxet, where he lured 20 Indians aboard his vessel under promise of trade, including Tisquantum. Once aboard, they were confined and the ship sailed across Cape Cod Bay where Hunt abducted seven more from the Nausets. He then set sail for Málaga.

Smith and Gorges both disapproved of Hunt's decision to enslave the Indians. Gorges worried about the prospect of "a warre now new begun between the inhabitants of those parts, and us"; he seemed mostly concerned about whether this event had upset his gold-finding plans with Epenow on Martha's Vineyard. Smith suggested that Hunt got his just deserts because "this wilde act kept him ever after from any more imploiment to those parts."

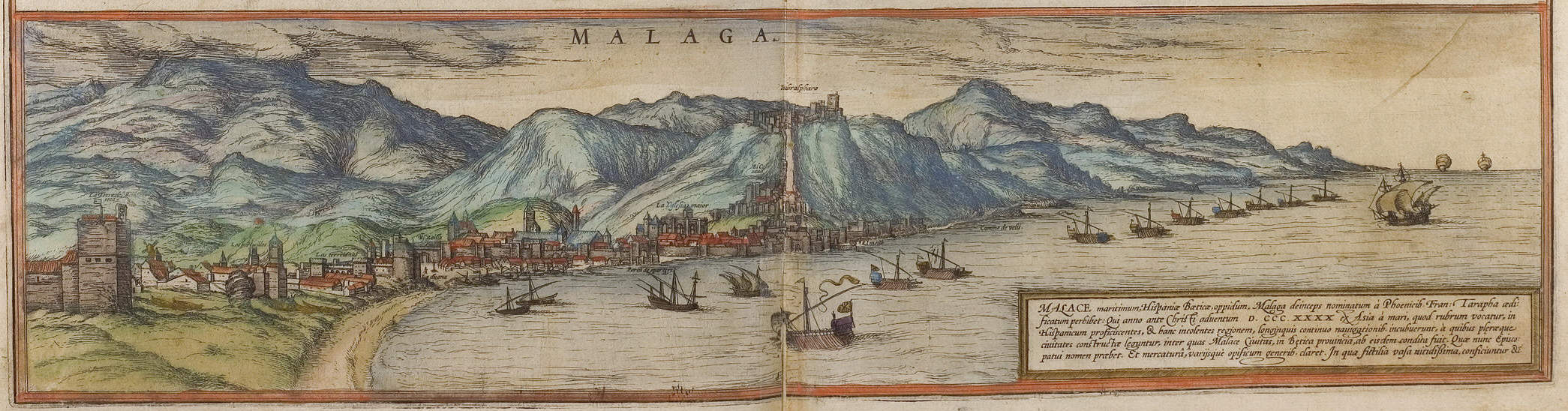
Málaga in 1572, 40 years before Tisquantum was delivered there in slavery

According to Gorges, Hunt took the Indians to the Strait of Gibraltar where he sold as many as he could. But the "Friers (sic) of those parts" discovered what he was doing, and they took the remaining Indians to be "instructed in the Christian Faith; and so disappointed this unworthy fellow of his hopes of gaine".

No truly primary sources of Tisquantum's arrival in Spain were known to exist until Spanish researcher Purificación Ruiz uncovered two deeds in public archives in Málaga, documenting the facts with original notarial records. Ruiz' findings show that on October 22, 1614, Thomas Hunt sold twenty-five Native Americans to Juan Bautista Reales, an adventurer known to historians for having been a Catholic priest, businessman and spy. The sale of the captives was thinly disguised owing to its illegal nature, because while slavery of North African captives was rampant, enslavement of Native Americans was against the law. Further research by Ruiz found two more notarial records showing that only two weeks later Málaga's Corregidor had regained control of twenty captives and distributed them among a number of local notables, with orders to have them educated in the Catholic faith and local mores. Tisquantum is said to have been baptized a Catholic.

No records show how long Tisquantum lived in Spain, what he did there, or how he "got away for England", as Bradford puts it. Prowse asserts that he spent four years in slavery in Spain and was then smuggled aboard a ship belonging to Guy's colony, taken to England, and then to Newfoundland. Smith attested that Tisquantum lived in England "a good time", although he does not say what he was doing there. Plymouth Governor William Bradford knew him best and recorded that he lived in Cornhill, London with "Master John Slanie". Slany was a merchant and shipbuilder who became another of the merchant adventurers of London seeking to make money from colonizing projects in America and was an investor in the East India Company.

=== Return to New England ===
According to the report by the Plymouth Council for New England in 1622, Tisquantum was in Newfoundland "with Captain Mason Governor there for the undertaking of that Plantation". Thomas Dermer was at Cuper's Cove in Conception Bay, an adventurer who had accompanied Smith on his abortive 1615 voyage to New England. Tisquantum and Dermer talked of New England while in Newfoundland, and Tisquantum persuaded him that he could make his fortune there, and Dermer wrote Gorges and requested that Gorges send him a commission to act in New England.

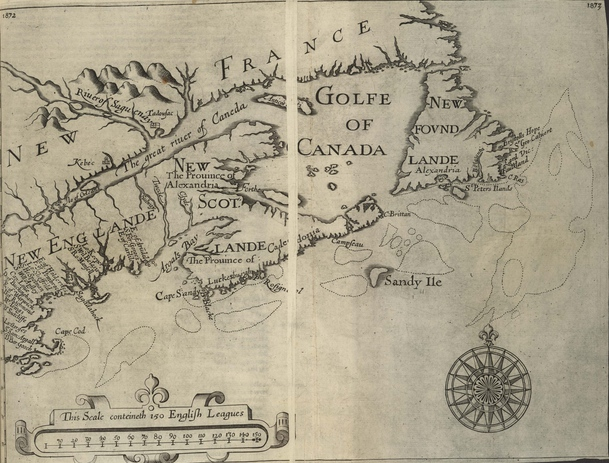
Map of New England from Newfoundland to Cape Cod in Purchas 1625, pp. IV:1880–81

Toward the end of 1619, Dermer and Tisquantum sailed down the New England coast to Massachusetts Bay. They discovered that all inhabitants had died in Tisquantum's home village at Patucket, so they moved inland to the village of Nemasket. Dermer sent Tisquantum to the village of Pokanoket near Bristol, Rhode Island, seat of Chief Massasoit. A few days later, Massasoit arrived at Nemasket along with Tisquantum and 50 warriors. It is not known whether Tisquantum and Massasoit had met prior to these events, but their interrelations can be traced at least to this date.

Dermer returned to Nemasket in June 1620, but this time he discovered that the Indians there bore "an inveterate malice to the English", according to a June 30, 1620, letter transcribed by Bradford. This sudden and dramatic change from friendliness to hostility was due to an incident the previous year, when a European coastal vessel lured some Indians on board with the promise of trade, only to mercilessly slaughter them. Dermer wrote that "Squanto cannot deny but they would have killed me when I was in Nemask, had he not entreated hard for me."

Some time after this encounter, Indians attacked Dermer, Tisquantum and their party on Martha's Vineyard. Dermer received "14 mortal wounds in the process". He fled to Virginia where he died. Sometime after this, Tisquantum fell in with the Pokanokets (neighbors of his native village), and was living with them by March 1622 when he was introduced to the Pilgrims.

== Plymouth Colony ==
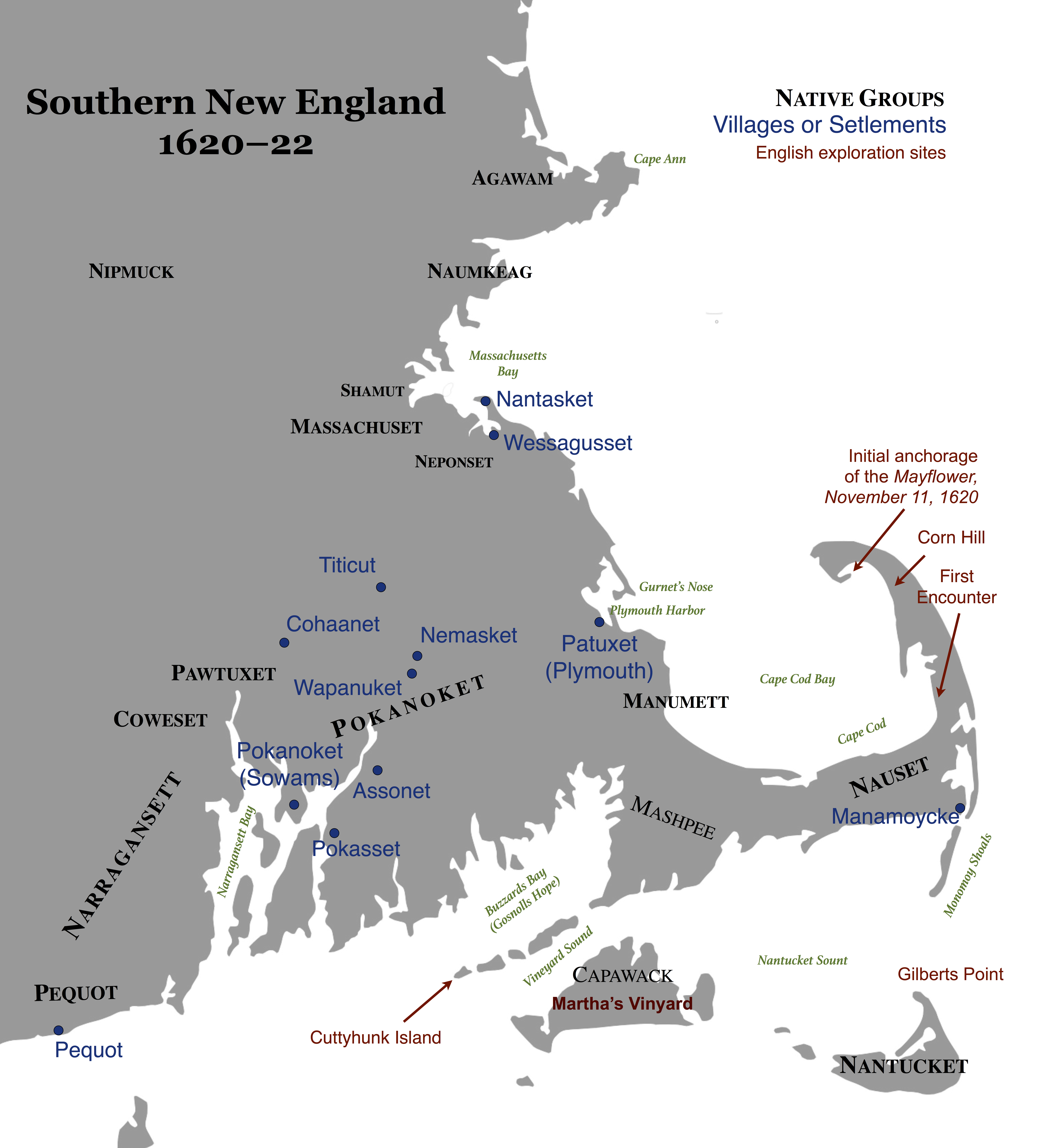
Map of Southern New England, 1620–22 showing Indian tribes, settlements, and exploration sites

The Massachusett Indians were north of Plymouth Colony, led by Chief Massasoit, and the Pokanoket tribe were north, east, and south. Tisquantum was living with the Pokanokets, as his native tribe of the Patuxets had been effectively wiped out prior to the arrival of the Mayflower; indeed, the Pilgrims had established the Patuxets former habitation as the site of Plymouth Colony. The Narragansett tribe inhabited Rhode Island.

Massasoit was faced with the dilemma whether to form an alliance with the Plymouth colonists, who might protect him from the Narragansetts, or try to put together a tribal coalition to drive out the colonists. To decide the issue, according to Bradford's account, "they got all the Powachs of the country, for three days together in a horrid and devilish manner, to curse and execrate them with their conjurations, which assembly and service they held in a dark and dismal swamp." Philbrick sees this as a convocation of shamans brought together to drive the colonists from the shores by supernatural means. (Note: See Philbrick 2006, pp. 95–96) Tisquantum had lived in England, and he told Massasoit "what wonders he had seen" there. He urged Massasoit to become friends with the Plymouth colonists, because his enemies would then be "Constrained to bowe to him". Also connected to Massasoit was Samoset, a minor Abenaki sachem who hailed from the Muscongus Bay area of Maine. Samoset (a mispronunciation of Somerset) had learned English in England as a captive of the Merchant Tailors Guild.

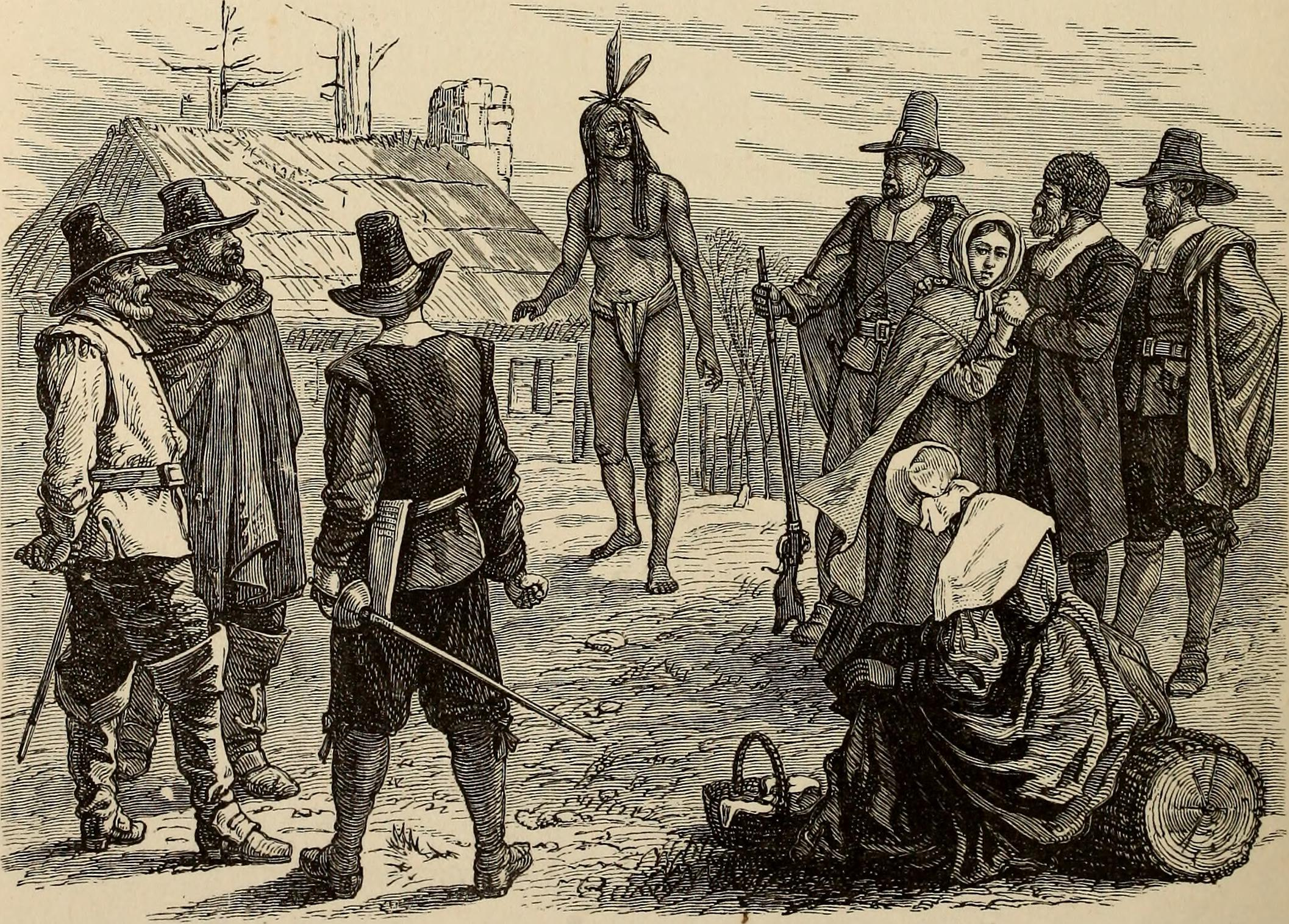
Samoset comes "boldly" into Plymouth settlement; woodcut designed by A.R. Waud and engraved by J.P. Davis (1876)

On Friday, March 16, 1621 (Old Style), the settlers were conducting military training when Samoset "boldly came alone" into the settlement. The colonists were initially alarmed, but he immediately set their fears at ease by asking for beer. He spent the day giving them intelligence of the surrounding tribes, then stayed for the night, leaving on Saturday morning. The next day, Samoset returned with five men all bearing deer skins and one cat skin. The settlers entertained them but refused to trade with them because it was Sunday, although they encouraged them to return with more furs. All left but Samoset who lingered until Wednesday, feigning illness. He returned once more on Thursday, March 22, 1621, this time with Tisquantum. The men brought important news: Massasoit, his brother Quadrquina, and all of their men were close by. After an hour's discussion, the sachem and his train of 60 men appeared on Strawberry Hill. Both the colonists and Massasoit's men were unwilling to make the first move, but Tisquantum shuttled between the groups and effected the simple protocol which permitted Edward Winslow to approach the sachem. Winslow, with Tisquantum as translator, proclaimed the loving and peaceful intentions of King James and the desire of their governor to trade and make peace with him. After Massasoit ate, Miles Standish led him to a house which was furnished with pillows and a rug. Governor Carver then came "with Drumme and Trumpet after him" to meet Massasoit. The parties ate together, then negotiated a treaty of peace and mutual defense between the Plymouth settlers and the Pokanoket people. According to Bradford, "all the while he sat by the Governour, he trembled for feare". Massasoit's followers applauded the treaty, and the peace terms were kept by both parties during Massasoit's lifetime.

=== Guide to frontier survival ===
Massasoit and his men left the day after the treaty, but Samoset and Tisquantum remained. Tisquantum and Bradford developed a close friendship, and Bradford relied on him heavily during his years as governor of the colony. Bradford considered him "a special instrument sent of God for their good beyond their expectation". Tisquantum instructed them in survival skills and acquainted them with their environment. "He directed them how to set their corn, where to take fish, and to procure other commodities, and was also their pilot to bring them to unknown places for their profit, and never left them till he died."

The day after Massasoit left Plymouth, Tisquantum spent the day at Eel River treading eels out of the mud with his feet. The bucketful of eels he brought back were "fat and sweet". Collection of eels became part of the settlers' annual practice. But Bradford makes special mention of Tisquantum's instruction concerning local horticulture. He had arrived at the time of planting for that year's crops, and Bradford said that "Squanto stood them in great stead, showing them both the manner how to set it, and after how to dress and tend it." Bradford wrote that Squanto showed them how to fertilize exhausted soil:

He told them, except they got fish and set with it [corn seed] in these old grounds it would come to nothing. And he showed them that in the middle of April they should have store enough [of fish] come up the brook by which they began to build, and taught them how to take it, and where to get other provisions necessary for them. All of which they found true by trial and experience.

Edward Winslow made the same point about the value of Indian cultivation methods in a letter to England at the end of the year:

We set the last Spring some twentie Acres of Indian Corne, and sowed some six Acres of Barly and Pease; and according to the manner of the Indians, we manured our ground with Herings or rather Shadds, which we have in great abundance, and take with great ease at our doores. Our Corn did prove well, & God be praysed, we had a good increase of Indian-Corne, and our Barly indifferent good, but our Pease were not worth the gathering, for we feared they were too late sowne.

The method shown by Tisquantum became the regular practice of the settlers. Tisquantum also showed the Plymouth colonists how they could obtain pelts with the "few trifling commodities they brought with them at first". Bradford reported that there was not "any amongst them that ever saw a beaver skin till they came here and were informed by Squanto". Fur trading became an important way for the colonists to pay off their financial debt to their financial sponsors in England.

=== Role in settler diplomacy ===
Thomas Morton stated that Massasoit was freed as a result of the peace treaty and "suffered [Tisquantum] to live with the English", and Tisquantum remained loyal to the colonists. One commentator has suggested that the loneliness occasioned by the wholesale extinction of his people was the motive for his attachment to the Plymouth settlers. Another has suggested that it was self-interest that he conceived while in the captivity of the Pokanoket. The settlers were forced to rely on Tisquantum because he was the only means by which they could communicate with the surrounding Indians, and he was involved in every contact for the 20 months that he lived with them.

==== Mission to Pokanoket ====
Plymouth Colony decided in June that a mission to Massasoit in Pokatoket would enhance their security and reduce visits by Indians who drained their food resources. Winslow wrote that they wanted to ensure that the peace treaty was still valued by the Pokanoket and to reconnoiter the surrounding country and the strength of the various tribes. They also hoped to show their willingness to repay the grain that they took on Cape Cod the previous winter, in the words of Winslow to "make satisfaction for some conceived injuries to be done on our parts".

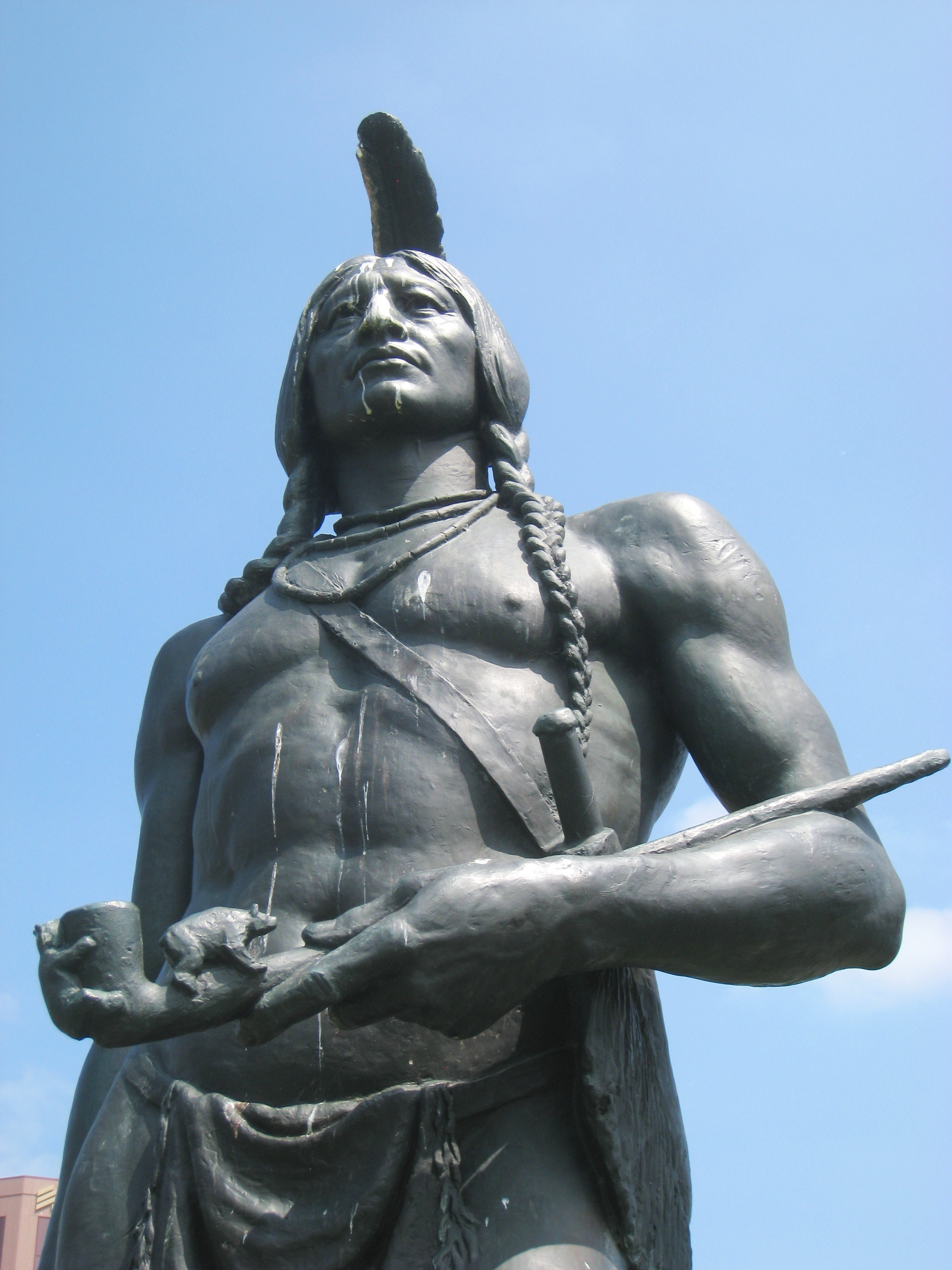
Sculpture of Massasoit in Mill Creek Park, Kansas City, Missouri by Cyrus E. Dallin (1920)

Governor Bradford selected Edward Winslow and Stephen Hopkins to make the journey with Tisquantum. They set off on July 2 (Note: Mourt's Relation says that they left on June 10, but Prince points out that it was a Sabbath and therefore unlikely to be the day of their departure. Both he and Young follow Bradford, who recorded that they left on July 2.) carrying a "Horse-mans coat" as a gift for Massasoit made of red cotton and trimmed "with a slight lace". They also took a copper chain and a message expressing their desire to continue and strengthen the peace between the two peoples and explaining the purpose of the chain. The colony was uncertain of their first harvest, and they requested that Massasoit restrain his people from visiting Plymouth as frequently as they had—though they wished always to entertain any guest of Massasoit. So if he gave anyone the chain, they would know that the visitor was sent by him and they would always receive him. The message also attempted to explain the settlers' conduct on Cape Cod when they took some corn, and they requested that he send his men to the Nauset to express the settlers' wish to make restitution. They departed at 9 a.m., and traveled for two days meeting friendly Indians along the way. When they arrived at Pokanoket, Massasoit had to be sent for, and Winslow and Hopkins gave him a salute with their muskets when he arrived, at Tisquantum's suggestion. Massasoit was grateful for the coat and assured them on all points that they made. He assured them that his 30 tributary villages would remain in peace and would bring furs to Plymouth. The colonists stayed for two days, then sent Tisquantum off to the various villages to seek trading partners for the English while they returned to Plymouth.

==== Mission to the Nauset ====
Winslow writes that young John Billington had wandered off and had not returned for five days. Bradford sent word to Massasoit, who made inquiry and found that the child had wandered into a Manumett village, who turned him over to the Nausets. Ten settlers set out and took Tisquantum as a translator and Tokamahamon as "a special friend," in Winslow's words. They sailed to Cummaquid by evening and spent the night anchored in the bay. In the morning, the two Indians on board were sent to speak to two Indians who were lobstering. They were told that the boy was at Nauset, and the Cape Cod Indians invited all the men to take food with them. The Plymouth colonists waited until the tide allowed the boat to reach the shore, and then they were escorted to sachem Iyanough who was in his mid-20s and "very personable, gentle, courteous, and fayre conditioned, indeed not like a Savage", in Winslow's words. The colonists were lavishly entertained, and Iyanough even agreed to accompany them to the Nausets. While in this village, they met an old woman, "no lesse then an hundred yeeres old", who wanted to see the colonists, and she told them of how her two sons were kidnapped by Hunt at the same time that Tisquantum was, and she had not seen them since. Winslow assured her that they would never treat Indians that way and "gave her some small trifles, which somewhat appeased her". After their lunch, the settlers took the boat to Nauset with the sachem and two of his band, but the tide prevented the boat from reaching shore, so the colonists sent Inyanough and Tisquantum to meet Nauset sachem Aspinet. The colonists remained in their shallop and Nauset men came "very thick" to entreat them to come ashore, but Winslow's party was afraid because this was the very spot of the First Encounter. One of the Indians whose corn they had taken the previous winter came out to meet them, and they promised to reimburse him. (Note: "we promised him restitution, & desired him either to come Patuxet for satisfaction, or else we would bring them so much corne againe, he promised to come, wee used him very kindly for the present.") That night, the sachem came with more than 100 men, the colonists estimated, and he bore the boy out to the shallop. The colonists gave Aspinet a knife and one to the man who carried the boy to the boat. By this, Winslow considered that "they made peace with us."

The Nausets departed, but the colonists learned (probably from Tisquantum) that the Narragansetts had attacked the Pokanokets and taken Massasoit. This caused great alarm because their own settlement was not well guarded given that so many were on this mission. The men tried to set off immediately, but they had no fresh water. After stopping again at Iyanough's village, they set off for Plymouth. This mission resulted in a working relationship between the Plymouth settlers and the Cape Cod Indians, both the Nausets and the Cummaquid, and Winslow attributed that outcome to Tisquantum. Bradford wrote that the Indians whose corn they had taken the previous winter came and received compensation, and peace generally prevailed.

==== Action to save Tisquantum in Nemasket ====
The men returned to Plymouth after rescuing the Billington boy, and it was confirmed to them that Massasoit had been ousted or taken by the Narragansetts. They also learned that Corbitant, a Pocasset sachem formerly tributary to Massasoit, was at Nemasket attempting to pry that band away from Massasoit. Corbitant was reportedly also railing against the peace initiatives that the Plymouth settlers had just had with the Cummaquid and the Nauset. Tisquantum was an object of Corbitant's ire because of his role in mediating peace with the Cape Cod Indians, but also because he was the principal means by which the settlers could communicate with the Indians. "If he were dead, the English had lost their tongue," he reportedly said. Hobomok was a Pokanoket pniese residing with the colonists, (Note: Bradford describes him as "a proper lusty man, and a man of account for his valour and parts amongst the Indians".) and he had also been threatened for his loyalty to Massasoit. Tisquantum and Hobomok were evidently too frightened to seek out Massasoit, and instead went to Nemasket to find out what they could. Tokamahamon, however, went looking for Massasoit. Corbitant discovered Tisquantum and Hobomok at Nemasket and captured them. He held Tisquantum with a knife to his breast, but Hobomok broke free and ran to Plymouth to alert them, thinking that Tisquantum had died.

Governor Bradford organized an armed task force of about a dozen men under the command of Miles Standish, and they set off before daybreak on August 14 under the guidance of Hobomok. The plan was to march the 14 miles to Nemasket, rest, and then take the village unawares in the night. The surprise was total, and the villagers were terrified. The colonists could not make the Indians understand that they were only looking for Corbitant, and there were "three sore wounded" trying to escape the house. The colonists realized that Tisquantum was unharmed and staying in the village, and that Corbitant and his men had returned to Pocaset. The colonists searched the dwelling, and Tisquantum came out after Hobomok called him from the top of the building. The settlers commandeered the house for the night. The next day, they explained to the village that they were interested only in Corbitant and those supporting him. They warned that they would exact retribution if Corbitant continued threatening them, or if Massasoit did not return from the Narragansetts, or if anyone attempted harm to any of Massasoit's subjects, including Tisquantum and Hobomok. They then marched back to Plymouth with Nemasket villagers helping bear their equipment.

Bradford wrote that this action resulted in a firmer peace, and that "divers sachems" congratulated the settlers and more came to terms with them. Even Corbitant made his peace through Massasoit. Nathaniel Morton later recorded that nine sub-sachems came to Plymouth on September 13, 1621, and signed a document declaring themselves "Loyal Subjects of King James, King of Great Britain, France and Ireland".

==== Mission to the Massachuset people ====
The Plymouth colonists resolved to meet with the Massachusetts Indians who had frequently threatened them. On August 18, a crew of ten settlers set off around midnight, with Tisquantum and two other Indians as interpreters, hoping to arrive before daybreak. But they misjudged the distance and were forced to anchor off shore and stay in the shallop over the next night. Once ashore, they found a woman coming to collect the trapped lobsters, and she told them where the villagers were. Tisquantum was sent to make contact, and they discovered that the sachem presided over a considerably reduced band of followers. His name was Obbatinewat, and he was a tributary of Massasoit. He explained that his current location within Boston harbor was not a permanent residence since he moved regularly to avoid the Tarentines (Note: The Abeneki were known as "Tarrateens" or "Tarrenteens" and lived on the Kennebec and nearby rivers in Maine. "There was great enmity between the Tarrentines and the Alberginians, or the Indians of Massachusetts Bay.") and the Squa Sachim (the widow of Nanepashemet). Obbatinewat agreed to submit himself to King James in exchange for the colonists' promise to protect him from his enemies. He also took them to see the squa sachem across the Massachusetts Bay.

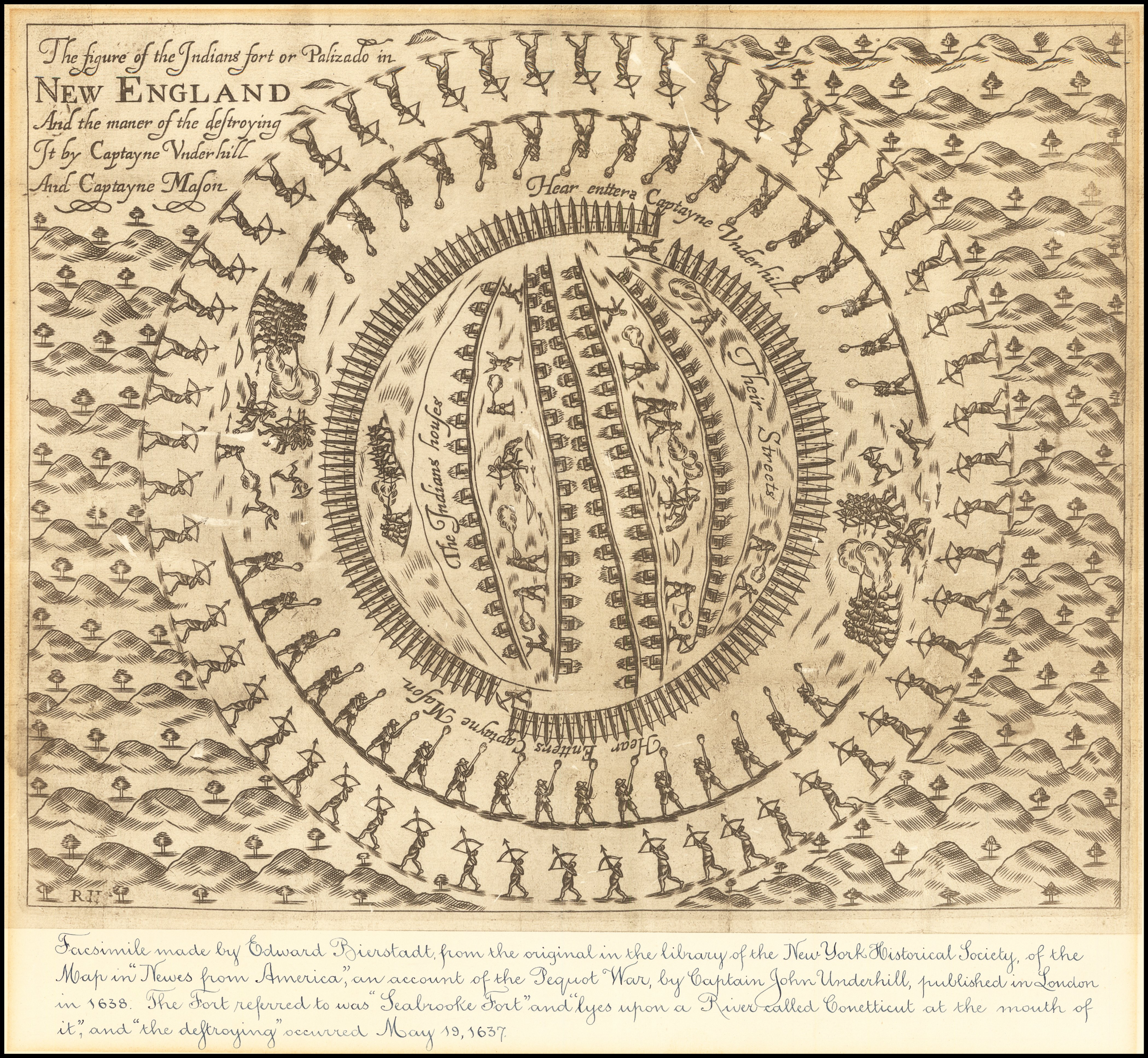
Engraving of a Pequot fort on Block Island in 1637 with design similar to the description of Nenepashemet's fort observed by Plymouth settlers in 1621

On Friday, September 21, the colonists went ashore and marched to a house where Nanepashemet was buried. They remained there and sent Tisquantum and another Indian to find the people. There were signs of hurried removal, but they found the women together with their corn and later a man who was brought trembling to the settlers. They assured him that they did not intend harm, and he agreed to trade furs with them. Tisquantum urged the colonists to simply "rifle" the women and take their skins on the ground, that "they are a bad people and oft threatned you," but the colonists insisted on treating them fairly. The women followed the men to the shallop, selling them everything that they had, including the coats off their backs. As the colonists shipped off, they noticed that the many islands in the harbor had been inhabited, some cleared entirely, but all the inhabitants had died. They returned with "a good quantity of beaver", but the men who had seen Boston Harbor expressed their regret that they had not settled there.

=== Peace regime ===
During the fall of 1621, the Plymouth settlers had every reason to be contented with their condition, less than one year after the "starving times". Bradford expressed the sentiment with biblical allusion (Note: Bradford quoted Deuteronomy 32:8, which those familiar would understand the unspoken allusion to a "waste howling wilderness." But the chapter also has the assurance that the Lord kept Jacob "as the apple of his eye.") that they found "the Lord to be with them in all their ways, and to bless their outgoings and incomings ..." Winslow was more prosaic when he reviewed the political situation with respect to surrounding natives in December 1621: "Wee have found the Indians very faithfull in their Covenant of Peace with us; very loving and readie to pleasure us ...," not only the greatest, Massasoit, "but also all the Princes and peoples round about us" for fifty miles. Even a sachem from Martha's Vineyard, who they never saw, and also seven others came in to submit to King James "so that there is now great peace amongst the Indians themselves, which was not formerly, neither would have bin but for us ..."

==== Thanksgiving ====
Bradford wrote in his journal that come fall together with their harvest of Indian corn, they had abundant fish and fowl, including many turkeys they took in addition to venison. He affirmed that the reports of plenty that many report "to their friends in England" were not "feigned but true reports". He did not, however, describe any harvest festival with their native allies. Winslow, however, did, and the letter which was included in Mourt's Relation became the basis for the tradition of "the first Thanksgiving". (Note: So Alexander Young put it as early as 1841.)

Winslow's description of what was later celebrated as the first Thanksgiving was quite short. He wrote that after the harvest (of Indian corn, their planting of peas were not worth gathering and their harvest of barley was "indifferent"), Bradford sent out four men fowling "so we might after a more special manner rejoice together, after we had gathered the fruit of our labours ..." The time was one of recreation, including the shooting of arms, and many Natives joined them, including Massasoit and 90 of his men, (Note: Humins surmises that the entourage included sachems and other headmen of the confederation's villages.") who stayed three days. They killed five deer which they presented to Bradford, Standish and others in Plymouth. Winslow concluded his description by telling his readers that "we are so farre from want, that we often wish you partakers of our plentie."

==== The Narragansett threat ====
The various treaties created a system where the English settlers filled the vacuum created by the epidemic. The villages and tribal networks surrounding Plymouth now saw themselves as tributaries to the English and (as they were assured) King James. The settlers also viewed the treaties as committing the Natives to a form of vassalage. Nathaniel Morton, Bradford's nephew, interpreted the original treaty with Massasoit, for example, as "at the same time" (not within the written treaty terms) acknowledging himself "content to become the Subject of our Sovereign Lord the King aforesaid, His Heirs and Successors, and gave unto them all the Lands adjacent, to them and their Heirs for ever". The problem with this political and commercial system was that it "incurred the resentment of the Narragansett by depriving them of tributaries just when Dutch traders were expanding their activities in the [Narragansett] bay". In January 1622 the Narraganset responded by issuing an ultimatum to the English.

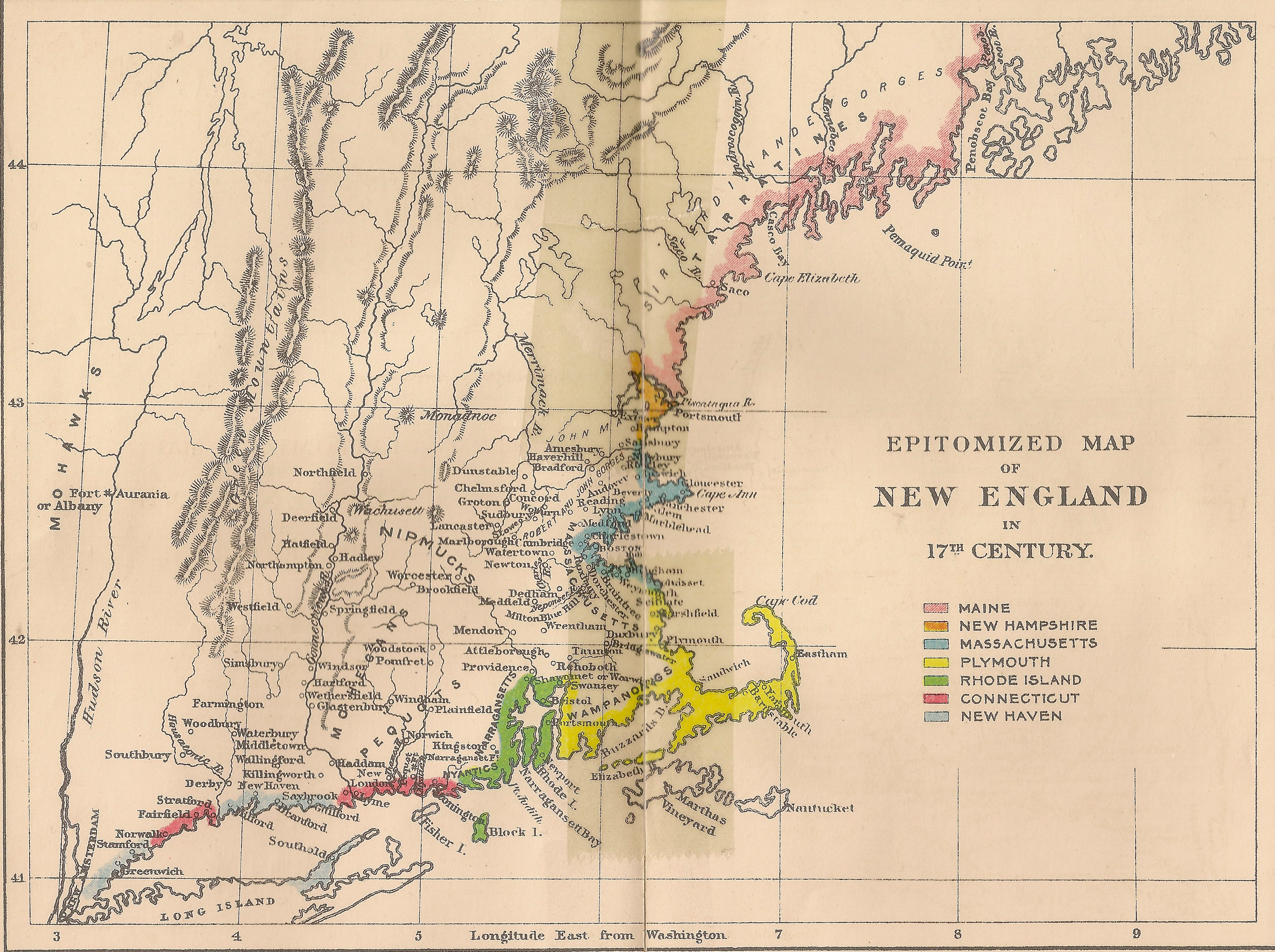
Map of Southern New England in the 17th century with locations of prominent societies of Ninnimissinuok.

In December 1621 the Fortune (which had brought 35 more settlers) had departed for England. (Note: According to John Smith's account in New England Trials (1622), the Fortune arrived at New Plymouth on November 11, 1621 o.s. and departed December 12. Bradford described the 35 that were to remain as "unexpected or looked for" and detailed how they were less prepared than the original settlers had been, bringing no provisions, no material to construct habitation and only the poorest of clothes. It was only when they entered Cape Cod Bay, according to Bradford, that they began to consider what desperation they would be in if the original colonists had perished. The Fortune also brought a letter from London financier Thomas Weston complaining about holding the Mayflower for so long the previous year and failing to lade her for her return. Bradford's response was surprisingly mild. They also shipped back three hogshead of furs as well as sasssafras, and clapboard for a total freight value of £500.) Not long afterwards rumors began to reach Plymouth that the Narragansett were making warlike preparations against the English. (Note: Winslow wrote that the Narragansett had sought and obtained a peace agreement with the Plymouth settlers the previous summer, although no mention of it is made in any of the writings of the settlers.) Winslow believed that that nation had learned that the new settlers brought neither arms nor provisions and thus in fact weakened the English colony. Bradford saw their belligerency as a result of their desire to "lord it over" the peoples who had been weakened by the epidemic (and presumably obtain tribute from them) and the colonists were "a bar in their way". In January 1621/22 a messenger from Narraganset sachem Canonicus (who travelled with Tokamahamon, Winslow's "special friend") arrived looking for Tisquantum, who was away from the settlement. Winslow wrote that the messenger appeared relieved and left a bundle of arrows wrapped in a rattlesnake skin. Rather than let him depart, however, Bradford committed him to the custody of Standish. The captain asked Winslow, who had a "speciall familiaritie" with other Indians, to see if he could get anything out of the messenger. The messenger would not be specific but said that he believed "they were enemies to us." That night Winslow and another (probably Hopkins) took charge of him. After his fear subsided, the messenger told him that the messenger who had come from Canonicus last summer to treat for peace, returned and persuaded the sachem on war. Canonicus was particularly aggrieved by the "meannesse" of the gifts sent him by the English, not only in relation to what he sent to colonists but also in light of his own greatness. On obtaining this information, Bradford ordered the messenger released.

When Tisquantum returned he explained that the meaning of the arrows wrapped in snake skin was enmity; it was a challenge. After consultation, Bradford stuffed the snake skin with powder and shot and had a Native return it to Canonicus with a defiant message. Winslow wrote that the returned emblem so terrified Canonicus that he refused to touch it, and that it passed from hand to hand until, by a circuitous route, it was returned to Plymouth.

=== Double dealing ===
Notwithstanding the colonists' bold response to the Narragansett challenge, the settlers realized their defenselessness to attack. Bradford instituted a series of measures to secure Plymouth. Most important they decided to enclose the settlement within a pale (probably much like what was discovered surrounding Nenepashemet's fort). They shut the inhabitants within gates that were locked at night, and a night guard was posted. Standish divided the men into four squadrons and drilled them in where to report in the event of alarm. They also came up with a plan of how to respond to fire alarms so as to have a sufficient armed force to respond to possible Native treachery. The fence around the settlement required the most effort since it required felling suitable large trees, digging holes deep enough to support the large timbers and securing them close enough to each other to prevent penetration by arrows. This work had to be done in the winter and at a time too when the settlers were on half rations because of the new and unexpected settlers. The work took more than a month to complete.

==== False alarms ====
By the beginning of March, the fortification of the settlement had been accomplished. It was now time when the settlers had promised the Massachuset they would come to trade for furs. They received another alarm however, this time from Hobomok, who was still living with them. Hobomok told of his fear that the Massachuset had joined in a confederacy with the Narraganset and if Standish and his men went there, they would be cut off and at the same time the Narraganset would attack the settlement at Plymouth. Hobomok also told them that Tisquantum was part of this conspiracy, that he learned this from other Natives he met in the woods and that the settlers would find this out when Tisquantum would urge the settlers into the Native houses "for their better advantage". This allegation must have come as a shock to the English given that Tisquantum's conduct for nearly a year seemed to have aligned him perfectly with the English interest both in helping to pacify surrounding societies and in obtaining goods that could be used to reduce their debt to the settlers' financial sponsors. Bradford consulted with his advisors, and they concluded that they had to make the mission despite this information. The decision was made partly for strategic reasons. If the colonists cancelled the promised trip out of fear and instead stayed shut up "in our new-enclosed towne", they might encourage even more aggression. But the main reason they had to make the trip was that their "Store was almost emptie" and without the corn they could obtain by trading "we could not long subsist ..." The governor therefore deputed Standish and 10 men to make the trip and sent along both Tisquantum and Hobomok, given "the jealousy between them".

Not long after the shallop departed, "an Indian belonging to Squanto's family" came running in. He betrayed signs of great fear, constantly looking behind him as if someone "were at his heels". He was taken to Bradford to whom he told that many of the Narraganset together with Corbitant "and he thought Massasoit" were about to attack Plymouth. Winslow (who was not there but wrote closer to the time of the incident than did Bradford) gave even more graphic details: The Native's face was covered in fresh blood which he explained was a wound he received when he tried speaking up for the settlers. In this account he said that the combined forces were already at Nemasket and were set on taking advantage of the opportunity supplied by Standish's absence. Bradford immediately put the settlement on military readiness and had the ordnance discharge three rounds in the hope that the shallop had not gone too far. Because of calm seas Standish and his men had just reached Gurnet's Nose, heard the alarm and quickly returned. When Hobomok first heard the news he "said flatly that it was false ..." Not only was he assured of Massasoit's faithfulness, he knew that his being a pniese meant he would have been consulted by Massasoit before he undertook such a scheme. To make further sure Hobomok volunteered his wife to return to Pokanoket to assess the situation for herself. At the same time Bradford had the watch maintained all that night, but there were no signs of Natives, hostile or otherwise.

Hobomok's wife found the village of Pokanoket quiet with no signs of war preparations. She then informed Massasoit of the commotion at Plymouth. The sachem was "much offended at the carriage of Tisquantum" but was grateful for Bradford's trust in him [Massasoit]. He also sent word back that he would send word to the governor, pursuant to the first article of the treaty they had entered, if any hostile actions were preparing.

==== Allegations against Tisquantum ====
Winslow writes that "by degrees wee began to discover Tisquantum," but he does not describe the means or over what period of time this discovery took place. There apparently was no formal proceeding. The conclusion reached, according to Winslow, was that Tisquantum had been using his proximity and apparent influence over the English settlers "to make himselfe great in the eyes of" local Natives for his own benefit. Winslow explains that Tisquantum convinced locals that he had the ability to influence the English toward peace or war and that he frequently extorted Natives by claiming that the settlers were about to kill them in order "that thereby hee might get gifts to himself to work their peace ..."

Bradford's account agrees with Winslow's to this point, and he also explains where the information came from: "by the former passages, and other things of like nature", evidently referring to rumors Hobomok said he heard in the woods. Winslow goes much further in his charge, however, claiming that Tisquantum intended to sabotage the peace with Massasoit by false claims about Massasoit's aggression "hoping whilest things were hot in the heat of bloud, to provoke us to march into his Country against him, whereby he hoped to kindle such a flame as would not easily be quenched, and hoping if that blocke were once removed, there were no other betweene him and honour" which he preferred over life and peace. Winslow later remembered "one notable (though) wicked practice of this Tisquantum"; namely, that he told the locals that the English possessed the "plague" buried under their storehouse and that they could unleash it at will. What he referred to was their cache of gunpowder. (Note: The story was revealed by Tisquantum himself when some barrels of gunpowder were unearthed under a house. Hobomok asked what they were, and Tisquantum replied that it was the plague that he had told him and others about. Oddly in a tale of the wickedness of Tisquantum for claiming the English had control over the plague is this addendum: Hobomok asked one of the settlers whether it was true, and the settler replied, "no; But the God of the English had it in store, and could send it at is pleasure to the destruction of his and our enemies.")

==== Massasoit's demand for Tisquantum ====
Captain Standish and his men eventually did go to the Massachuset and returned with a "good store of Trade". On their return, they saw that Massasoit was there and he was displaying his anger against Tisquantum. Bradford did his best to appease him, and he eventually departed. Not long afterward, however, he sent a messenger demanding that Tisquantum be put to death. Bradford responded that although Tisquantum "deserved to die both in respect of him [Massasoit] and us", Tisquantum was too useful to the settlers because otherwise, he had no one to translate. Not long afterward, the same messenger returned, this time with "divers others", demanding Tisquantum. They argued that Tisquantum being a subject of Massasoit, was subject, pursuant to the first article of the Peace Treaty, to the sachem's demand, in effect, rendition. They further argued that if Bradford would not produce pursuant to the Treaty, Massasoit had sent many beavers' skins to induce his consent. Finally, if Bradford still would not release him to them, the messenger had brought Massasoit's own knife by which Bradford himself could cut off Tisquantum's head and hands to be returned with the messenger. Bradford avoided the question of Massasoit's right under the treaty (Note: The first two numbered items of the treaty as it was printed in Mourt's Relation provided: "1. That neither he nor any of his should injure or doe hurt to any of our people. 2. And if any of his did hurt to any of ours, he should send the offender, that we might punish him." As printed the terms do not seem reciprocal, but Massasoit apparently thought they were. Neither Bradford in his answer to the messenger, nor Bradford or Winslow in their history of this event denies that the treaty entitled Massasoit to the return of Tisquantum.) but refused the beaver pelts saying that "It was not the manner of the English to sell men's lives at a price ..." The governor called Tisquantum (who had promised not to flee), who denied the charges and ascribed them to Hobomok's desire for his downfall. He nonetheless offered to abide by Bradford's decision. Bradford was "ready to deliver him into the hands of his Executioners" but at that instance, a boat passed before the town in the harbor. Fearing that it might be the French, Bradford said he had to first identify the ship before dealing with the demand. The messenger and his companions, however, "mad with rage, and impatient at delay" left "in great heat".

=== Final mission with the settlers ===
==== Arrival of the Sparrow ====
The ship the English saw pass before the town was not French, but rather a shallop from the Sparrow, a shipping vessel sponsored by Thomas Weston and one other of the Plymouth settlement's sponsors, which was plying the eastern fishing grounds. This boat brought seven additional settlers but no provisions whatsoever "nor any hope of any". In a letter they brought, Weston explained that the settlers were to set up a salt pan operation on one of the islands in the harbor for the private account of Weston. He asked the Plymouth colony, however, to house and feed these newcomers, provide them with seed stock and (ironically) salt, until he was able to send the salt pan to them. The Plymouth settlers had spent the winter and spring on half rations in order to feed the settlers that had been sent nine months ago without provisions. Now Weston was exhorting them to support new settlers who were not even sent to help the plantation. He also announced that he would be sending another ship that would discharge more passengers before it would sail on to Virginia. He requested that the settlers entertain them in their houses so that they could go out and cut down timber to lade the ship quickly so as not to delay its departure. Bradford found the whole business "but cold comfort to fill their hungry bellies". Bradford was not exaggerating. Winslow described the dire straits. They now were without bread "the want whereof much abated the strength and the flesh of some, and swelled others". Without hooks or seines or netting, they could not collect the bass in the rivers and cove, and without tackle and navigation rope, they could not fish for the abundant cod in the sea. Had it not been for shellfish which they could catch by hand, they would have perished. But there was more, Weston also informed them that the London backers had decided to dissolve the venture. Weston urged the settlers to ratify the decision; only then might the London merchants send them further support, although what motivation they would then have he did not explain. That boat also, evidently, (Note: The events in Bradford's and Winslow's chronologies, or at least the ordering of the narratives, do not agree. Bradford's order is: (1) Provisions spent, no source of food found; (2) end of May brings shallop from Sparrow with Weston letters and seven new settlers; (3) Charity and Swan arrive depositing "sixty lusty men"'; (4) amidst "their straights" letter from Huddleston brought by "this boat" from the east; (5) Winslow and men return with them; (6) "this summer" they build fort. Winslow's sequence is: (1) Shallop from Sparrow arrives; (2) end of May 1622, food storehouse spent; (3) Winslow and his men sail to Damariscove in Maine; (4) on return finds state of colony much weakened from lack of bread; (5) Native taunts cause settlers to start building fort, at expense of planting; (6) end of June–beginning of July Charity and Swan arrive. The chronology adopted below follows Willison's combination of the two accounts. Although Bradford's rather careless use of pronouns makes it unclear which "pilot" Winslow followed to the fishing grounds in Maine (which carried the Huddleton letter) or indeed who brought the Huddleton letter, it is likely the shallop from the Sparrow and not another boat from Huddleston himself, as Willison and Adams before him conclude. Philbrick has Huddleston's letter arrive after the Charity and Swan, and only mentions Winslow's voyage to the fishing grounds, which, if it took place after the arrival of those two vessels, would have taken place after the end of the fishing season.) contained alarming news from the South. John Huddleston, who was unknown to them but captained a fishing ship that had returned from Virginia to the Maine fishing grounds, advised his "good friends at Plymouth" of the massacre in the Jamestown settlements by the Powhatan in which he said 400 had been killed. He warned them: "Happy is he whom other men's harms doth make to beware." This last communication Bradford decided to turn to their advantage. Sending a return for this kindness, they might also seek fish or other provisions from the fishermen. Winslow and a crew were selected to make the voyage to Maine, 150 miles away, to a place they had never been. In Winslow's reckoning, he left at the end of May for Damariscove. (Note: The islands off the Damariscove river in Maine early on provided stages for fishermen from early times. Damariscove Island was called Damerill's Isles on John Smith's 1614 map. Bradford noted that in 1622 there "were many more ships come afishing". The Sparrow was stationed on these grounds. Morison states that 300 to 400 sails of different countries, including 30 to 40 English as well as some from Virginia, came to fish these grounds in May, leaving in the summer. Winslow's mission was to beg or borrow supplies from these fishermen.) Winslow found the fishermen more than sympathetic and they freely gave what they could. Even though this was not as much as Winslow hoped, it was enough to keep them going until the harvest.

When Winslow returned, the threat they felt had to be addressed. The general anxiety aroused by Huddleston's letter was heightened by the increasingly hostile taunts they learned of. Surrounding villagers were "glorying in our weaknesse", and the English heard threats about how "easie it would be ere long to cut us off". Even Massasoit turned cool towards the English, and could not be counted on to tamp down this rising hostility. So they decided to build a fort on burying hill in town. And just as they did when building the palisade, the men had to cut down trees, haul them from the forest and up the hill and construct the fortified building, all with inadequate nutrition and at the neglect of dressing their crops.

==== Weston's English settlers ====
They might have thought they reached the end of their problems, but in June 1622 the settlers saw two more vessels arrive, carrying 60 additional mouths to feed. These were the passengers that Weston had written would be unloaded from the vessel going on to Virginia. That vessel also carried more distressing news. Weston informed the governor that he was no longer a part of the company sponsoring the Plymouth settlement. The settlers he sent just now, and requested the Plymouth settlement to house and feed, were for his own enterprise. The "sixty lusty men" would not work for the benefit of Plymouth; in fact he had obtained a patent and as soon as they were ready they would settle an area in Massachusetts Bay. Other letters also were brought. The other venturers in London explained that they had bought out Weston, and everyone was better off without him. Weston, who saw the letter before it was sent, advised the settlers to break off from the remaining merchants, and as a sign of good faith delivered a quantity of bread and cod to them. (Although, as Bradford noted in the margin, he "left not his own men a bite of bread.") The arrivals also brought news that the Fortune had been taken by French pirates, and therefore all their past effort to export American cargo (valued at £500) would count for nothing. Finally Robert Cushman sent a letter advising that Weston's men "are no men for us; wherefore I prey you entertain them not"; he also advised the Plymouth Separatists not to trade with them or loan them anything except on strict collateral."I fear these people will hardly deal so well with the savages as they should. I pray you therefore signify to Squanto that they are a distinct body from us, and we have nothing to do with them, neither must be blamed for their faults, much less can warrant their fidelity." As much as all this vexed the governor, Bradford took in the men and fed and housed them as he did the others sent to him, even though Weston's men would compete with his colony for pelts and other Native trade. But the words of Cushman would prove prophetic.

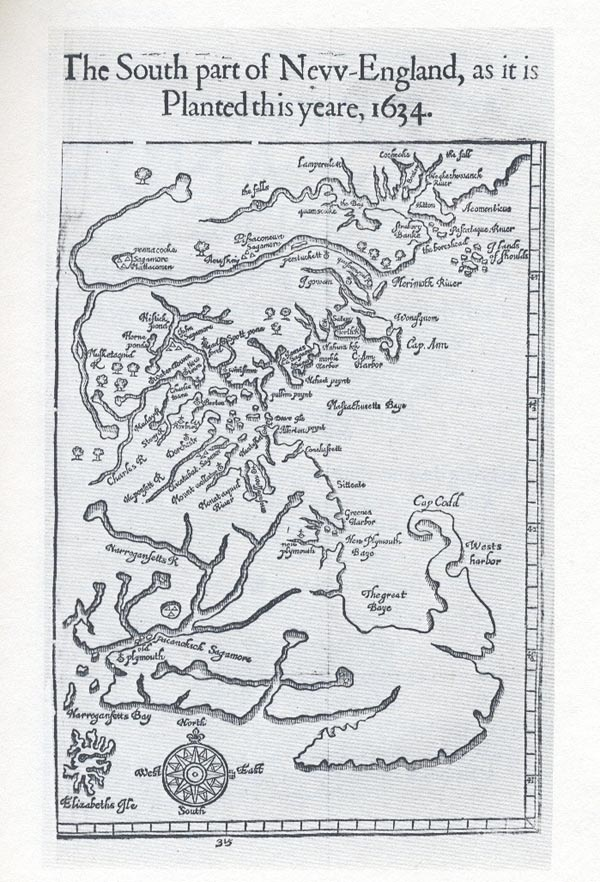
Map contained as frontispiece to Wood 1634.

Weston's men, "stout knaves" in the words of Thomas Morton, were roustabouts collected for adventure and they scandalized the mostly strictly religious villagers of Plymouth. Worse, they stole the colony's corn, wandering into the fields and snatching the green ears for themselves. When caught, they were "well whipped", but hunger drove them to steal "by night and day". The harvest again proved disappointing, so that it appeared that "famine must still ensue, the next year also" for lack of seed. And they could not even trade for staples because their supply of items the Natives sought had been exhausted. Part of their cares were lessened when their coasters returned from scouting places in Weston's patent and took Weston's men (except for the sick, who remained) to the site they selected for settlement, called Wessagusset (now Weymouth). But not long after, even there they plagued Plymouth, who heard, from Natives once friendly with them, that Weston's settlers were stealing their corn and committing other abuses. At the end of August a fortuitous event staved off another starving winter: the Discovery, bound for London, arrived from a coasting expedition from Virginia. The ship had a cargo of knives, beads and other items prized by Natives, but seeing the desperation of the colonists the captain drove a hard bargain: He required them to buy a large lot, charged them double their price and valued their beaver pelts at 3s. per pound, which he could sell at 20s. "Yet they were glad of the occasion and fain to buy at any price ..."

==== Trading expedition with Weston's men ====
The Charity returned from Virginia at the end of September–beginning of October. It proceeded on to England, leaving the Wessagusset settlers well provisioned. The Swan was left for their use as well. It was not long after they learned that the Plymouth settlers had acquired a store of trading goods that they wrote Bradford proposing that they jointly undertake a trading expedition, they to supply the use of the Swan. They proposed equal division of the proceeds with payment for their share of the goods traded to await arrival of Weston. (Bradford assumed they had burned through their provisions.) Bradford agreed and proposed an expedition southward of the Cape.

Winslow wrote that Tisquantum and Massasoit had "wrought" a peace (although he doesn't explain how this came about). With Tisquantum as guide, they might find the passage among the Monomoy Shoals to Nantucket Sound; (Note: These were the same "perilous shoals and breakers" that caused the Mayflower to turn back on November 9, 1620 o.s.) Tisquantum had advised them he twice sailed through the shoals, once on an English and once on a French vessel. The venture ran into problems from the start. When in Plymouth Richard Green, Weston's brother-in-law and temporary governor of the colony, died. After his burial and receiving directions to proceed from the succeeding governor of Wessagusset, Standish was appointed leader but twice the voyage was turned back by violent winds. On the second attempt, Standish fell ill. On his return Bradford himself took charge of the enterprise. In November they set out. When they reached the shoals, Tisquantum piloted the vessel, but the master of the vessel did not trust the directions and bore up. Tisquantum directed him through a narrow passage, and they were able to harbor near Mamamoycke (now Chatham).

That night Bradford went ashore with a few others, Tisquantum acting as translator and facilitator. Not having seen any of these Englishmen before, the Natives were initially reluctant. But Tisquantum coaxed them and they provided a plentiful meal of venison and other victuals. They were reluctant to allow the English to see their homes, but when Bradford showed his intention to stay on shore, they invited him to their shelters, having first removed all their belongings. As long as the English stayed, the Natives would disappear "bag and baggage" whenever their possessions were seen. Eventually Tisquantum persuaded them to trade and as a result, the settlers obtained eight hogsheads of corn and beans. The villagers also told them that they had seen vessels "of good burthen" pass through the shoals. And so, with Tisquantum feeling confident, the English were prepared to make another attempt. But suddenly Tisquantum became ill and died.

== Death ==
The sickness seems to have greatly shaken Bradford, for they lingered there for several days before he died. Bradford described his death in some detail:

In this place Tisquantum fell sick of Indian fever, bleeding much at the nose (which the Indians take as a symptom of death) and within a few days died there; desiring the Governor to pray for him, that he might go to the Englishmen's God in Heaven; and bequeathed sundry of his things to English friends, as remembrances of his love; of whom they had a great loss.

Without Tisquantum to pilot them, the English settlers decided against trying the shoals again and returned to Cape Cod Bay.

The English Separatists were comforted by the fact that Tisquantum had become a Christian convert. William Wood writing a little more than a decade later explained why some of the Ninnimissinuok began recognizing the power of "the Englishmens God, as they call him": "because they could never yet have power by their conjurations to damnifie the English either in body or goods" and since the introduction of the new spirit "the times and seasons being much altered in seven or eight years, freer from lightning and thunder, and long droughts, suddaine and tempestuous dashes of rain, and lamentable cold Winters".

Philbrick speculates that Tisquantum may have been poisoned by Massasoit. His bases for the claim are (i) that other Native Americans had engaged in assassinations during the 17th century; and (ii) that Massasoit's own son, Metacomet, may have assassinated John Sassamon, an event that led to the bloody King Philip's War a half-century later. He suggests that the "peace" Winslow says was lately made between the two could have been a "rouse" but does not explain how Massasoit could have accomplished the feat on the very remote southeast end of Cape Cod, more than 85 miles distant from Pokanoket.

Tisquantum is reputed to be buried at Burial Hill in the village of Chathamport, a headland burial ground above and just north of William Nickerson's 1656 homesite. (Note: A marker on the front lawn of the Nickerson Genealogical Research Center on Orleans Road in Chatham states that Tisquantum is buried at the head of Ryder's Cove. Nickerson claims that the skeleton which washed out "of a hill between Head of the Bay and Cove's Pond" around 1770 was probably Squanto's.)

== Assessment, memorials, representations, and folklore ==
=== Historical assessment ===
Because almost all the historical records of Tisquantum were written by English Separatists and because most of that writing had the purpose to attract new settlers, give account of their actions to their financial sponsors or to justify themselves to co-religionists, they tended to relegate Tisquantum (or any other Native American) to the role of assistant to them in their activities. No real attempt was made to understand Tisquantum or Native culture, particularly religion. The closest that Bradford got in analyzing him was to say "that Tisquantum sought his own ends and played his own game, ... to enrich himself". But in the end, he gave "sundry of his things to sundry of his English friends".

Historians' assessment of Tisquantum depended on the extent they were willing to consider the possible biases or motivations of the colonial witnesses. Earlier historians tended to take the colonists' statements at face value. Current historians, especially those familiar with ethnohistorical research, have given a more nuanced view of Tisquantum, among other Native Americans.

Adams (writing in 1892) characterized Tisquantum as "a notable illustration of the innate childishness of the Indian character". By contrast, Shuffelton (writing in 1976) said that "in his own way, [he] was quite as sophisticated as his English friends, and he was one of the most widely traveled men in the New England of his time, having visited Spain, England, and Newfoundland, as well as a large expanse of his own region." Early Plymouth historian Judge John Davis (writing in 1826) also saw Tisquantum as a "child of nature", but was willing to grant him some usefulness to the enterprise: "With some aberrations, his conduct was generally irreproachable, and his useful services to the infant settlement, entitle him to grateful remembrance." Adolf (writing in 1964) was much harder on the character of Tisquantum ("his attempt to aggrandize himself by playing the Whites and Indians against each other indicates an unsavory facet of his personality") but gave him more importance (without him "the founding and development of Plymouth would have been much more difficult, if not impossible."). Most have followed the line that Baylies early took when (writing in 1836) he acknowledged the alleged duplicity but also the significant contribution to the settlers' survival: "Although Squanto had discovered [= revealed] some traits of duplicity, yet his loss was justly deemed a public misfortune, as he had rendered the English much service."

=== Memorials and landmarks ===
As for monuments and memorials, although many (as Willison put it) "clutter up the Pilgrim towns there is none to Squanto..." The first settlers may have named after him the peninsula called Squantum once in Dorchester, now in Quincy, during their first expedition there with Tisquantum as their guide. Thomas Morton refers to a place called "Squanto's Chappell", but this is probably another name for the peninsula.

=== Literature and popular entertainment ===
Tisquantum rarely makes appearances in literature or popular entertainment. Of all the 19th-century New England poets and story tellers who drew on pre-Revolution America for their characters, only one seems to have mentioned Tisquantum. And while Henry Wadsworth Longfellow himself had five ancestors aboard the Mayflower, "The Courtship of Miles Standish" has the captain blustering at the beginning, daring the savages to attack, yet the enemies he addresses could not have been known to him by name until their peaceful intentions had already been made known:

Let them come if they like, be it sagamore, sachem, or pow-wow,
Aspinet, Samoset, Corbitant, Squanto, or Tokamahamon!

Tisquantum is almost equally scarce in popular entertainment, but when he appeared it was typically in implausible fantasies. Very early in what Willison calls the "Pilgrim Apotheosis", marked by the 1793 sermon of Reverend Chandler Robbins, in which he described the Mayflower settlers as "pilgrims", a "Melo Drama" was advertised in Boston titled "The Pilgrims, Or the Landing of the Forefathrs at Plymouth Rock" filled with Indian threats and comic scenes. In Act II Samoset carries off the maiden Juliana and Winslow for a sacrifice, but the next scene presents "A dreadful Combat with Clubs and Shileds, between Samoset and Squanto". Nearly two centuries later Tisquantum appears again as an action figure in the Disney film Squanto: A Warrior's Tale (1994) with not much more fidelity to history. Tisquantum (voiced by Frank Welker) appears in the first episode ("The Mayflower Voyagers", aired October 21, 1988) of the animated mini-series This Is America, Charlie Brown. A more historically accurate depiction of Tisquantum (as played by Kalani Queypo) appeared in the National Geographic Channel film Saints & Strangers, written by Eric Overmyer and Seth Fisher, which aired the week of Thanksgiving 2015. A brief story of Squanto appears in the novel Dark Tides by Philippa Gregory (Apria Books, 2020). Focus on the Family created an audio drama entitled, The Legend of Squanto in 1997 with Peter Brook portraying Squanto. The story focuses on Squanto's early life as well as his life interactions with the Pilgrims.

=== Didactic literature and folklore ===
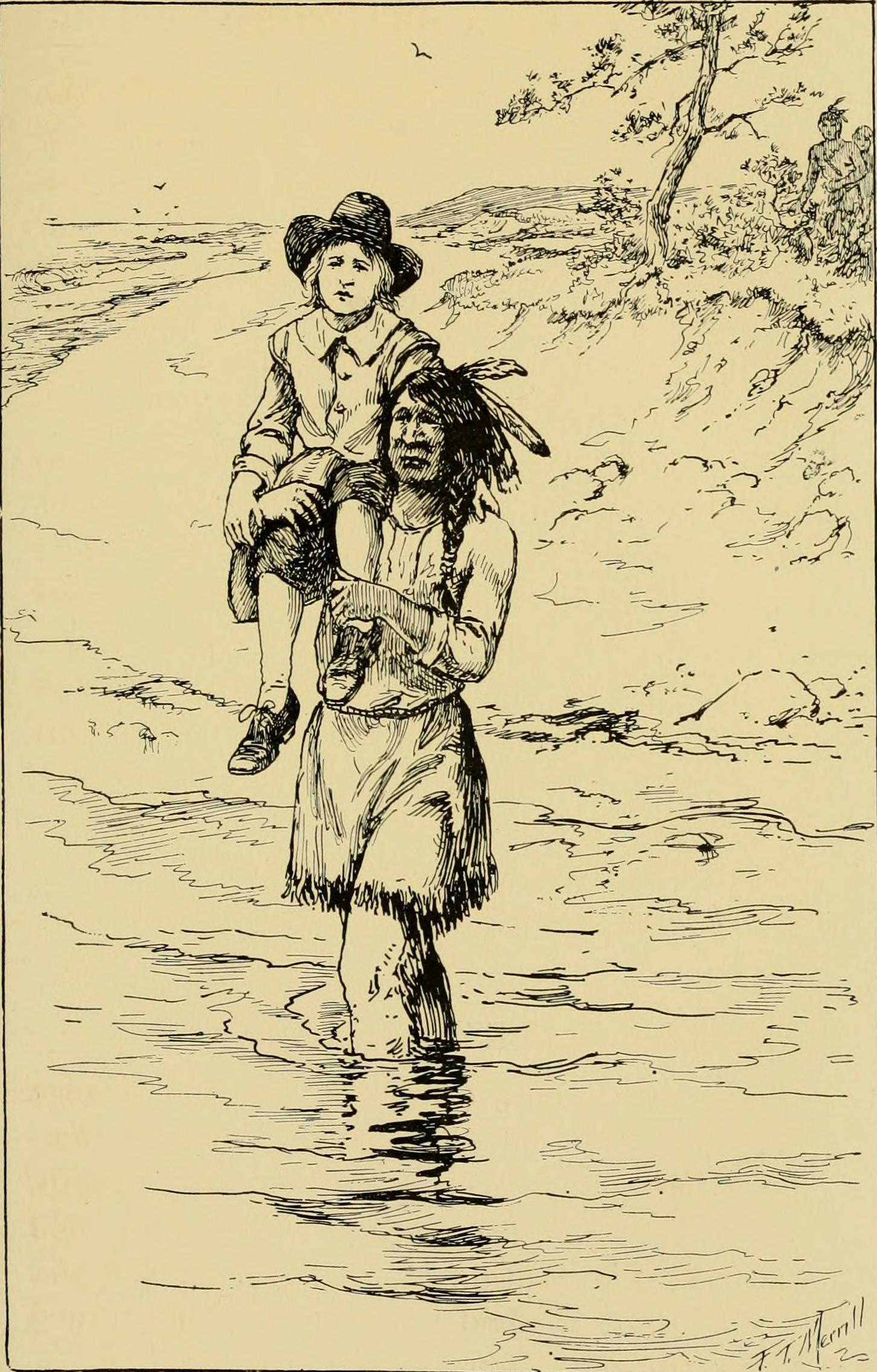
Tisquantum returning John Billington from the Nauset in a 1922 storybook for children.

Where Tisquantum is most encountered is in literature designed to instruct children and young people, provide inspiration, or guide them to a patriotic or religious truth. This came about for two reasons. First, Lincoln's establishment of Thanksgiving as a national holiday enshrined the New England Anglo-Saxon festival, vaguely associated with an American strain of Protestantism, as something of a national origins myth, in the middle of a divisive Civil War when even some Unionists were becoming concerned with rising non-Anglo-Saxon immigration. This coincided, as Ceci noted, with the "noble savage" movement, which was "rooted in romantic reconstructions of Indians (for example, Hiawatha) as uncorrupted natural beings—who were becoming extinct—in contrast to rising industrial and urban mobs". She points to the Indian Head coin first struck in 1859 "to commemorate their passing.'" Even though there was only the briefest mention of "Thanksgiving" in the Plymouth settlers' writings, and despite the fact that he was not mentioned as being present (although, living with the settlers, he likely was), Tisquantum was the focus around which both storylines could be wrapped. He is, or at least a fictionalized portrayal of him, thus a favorite of certain politically conservative American Protestant groups. (Note: See, for example, "The Story of Squanto". Christian Worldview Journal. August 26, 2009. Archived from the original on December 8, 2013.; "Squanto: A Thanksgiving Drama". Focus on the Family Daily Broadcast. May 1, 2007.; "Tell Your Kids the Story of Squanto". Christian Headlines. November 19, 2014.; "History of Thanksgiving Indian: Why Squanto already knew English". Bill Petro: Building the Gap from Strategy and Execution. November 23, 2016..)

The story of the selfless "noble savage" who patiently guided and occasionally saved the "Pilgrims" (to whom he was subservient and who attributed their good fortune solely to their faith, all celebrated during a bounteous festival) was thought to be an enchanting figure for children and young adults. Beginning early in the 20th century Tisquantum entered high school textbooks, (Note: The illustration at the head of this article, for example, is one of two of Tisquantum in Bricker, Garland Armor (1911). The Teaching of Agriculture in the High School. New York: Macmillan Co. (Plates after p. 112.)) children's read-aloud and self-reading books, (Note: For example, Olcott, Frances Jenkins (1922). Good Stories for Great Birthdays, Arranged for Story-Telling and Reading Aloud and for the Children's Own Reading. Boston: Houghton Mifflin Co. This book was reissued by the University of Virginia Library in 1995. Tisquantum is referred to as "Tisquantum" and "A Big Indian" in the stories entitled "The Father of the New England Colonies" (William Bradford), at pp. 125–139. See also Bradstreet, Howard (1925). Squanto. [Hartford? Conn.]: [Bradstreet?].) more recently learn-to-read and coloring books and children's religious inspiration books. (Note: E.g., Hobbs, Carolyn; Roland, Pat (1981). Squanto. Milton, Florida: Printed by the Children's Bible Club. The Legend of Squanto. Carol Stream, Illinois. 2005. Metaxas, Eric (2005). Squanto and the First Thanksgiving. Rowayton, Connecticut: ABDO Publishing Co. The book was retitled Squanto and the Miracle of Thanksgiving when it was republished in 2014 by the religious publisher Thomas Nelson. The book was turned into an animated video by Rabbit Ears Entertainment in 2007.) Over time and particularly depending on the didactic purpose, these books have greatly fictionalized what little historical evidence remains of Tisquantum's life. Their portraits of Tisquantum's life and times spans the gamut of accuracy. Those intending to teach a moral lesson or tell history from a religious viewpoint tend to be the least accurate even when they claim to be telling a true historical story. (Note: For example, Metaxas 2005, praised as a "true story" by the author's colleague Chuck Colson, misstates almost every well documented fact in Tisquantum's life. It begins with the abduction of 12 year old Tisquantum which the first sentence dates at "the year of our Lord 1608" (rather than 1614). When he meets the "Pilgrims" he greets Governor Bradford (rather than Carver). The rest is a fictIonalized religious parable which ends with Tisquantum (after "Thanksgiving" and before any allegations of treachery) thanking God for the Pilgrims.) Recently there have been attempts to tell the story as accurately as possible, without reducing Tisquantum to a mere servant of the English. (Note: Bruchac 2000, for example, even names Hunt, Smith and Dermer and tries to portray Tisquantum from a Native American, rather than "Pilgrim," perspective.) There have even been attempts to place the story in the social and historical context of fur trade, epidemics and land disputes. Almost none, however, have dealt with Tisquantum's life after "Thanksgiving" (except occasionally the story of the rescue of John Billington). An exception to all of that is the publication of a "young adult" version of Philbrick's best-selling adult history. Nevertheless, given the sources which can be drawn on, Tisquantum's story inevitably is seen from the European perspective.

== See also ==
- Shanawdithit and Demasduit were the last members of the Beothuk people of Newfoundland and Labrador
- Ishi, the last known member of the Yahi people of California
- The Man of the Hole, last member of an uncontacted people of Brazil
- Juana Maria, the last known member of the Nicoleño tribe

== Notes, references and sources ==
=== Sources ===
==== Primary ====
- Archer, Gabriel (1843). "The Relation of Captain Gosnold's Voyage to the North part of Virginia, begun the sixth-and twentieth of March, Anno 42 Elizabethae Reginae, 1602, and delivered by Gabriel Archer, a gentleman in the said voyage". Collections of the Massachusetts Historical Society. 3. 8: 72–81. The book was first published in Purchas 1625, pp. IV:1647–51. An annotated version is contained in Levermore 1912, pp. I:43–54.
- Bradford, William (1906). Governor William Bradford's Letter Book. Boston, Massachusetts: Massachusetts Society of Mayflower Descendants.
- Bradford, William (1952). Morison, Samuel Eliot (ed.). Of Plymouth Plantation, 1620–1647. New York: Alfred A. Knopf. LCCN 51013222. This is the modern critical edition of the manuscript by William Bradford entitled simply Of plimouth plantation. In the notes and references the manuscript (as opposed to the printed versions) is sometimes referred to as OPP. The first book of the manuscript had been copied into Plymouth church records by Nathaniel Morton, Bradford's nephew and secretary, and it was this version that was annotated and printed in Young 1841, pp. 1–108, the original at a time having been missing since the beginning of the American Revolution. In the decade after the publication by Young, the original manuscript was discovered to be in the library of the Bishop of London in Fulham Palace. The Massachusetts Historical Society arranged for a longhand copy to be made. That version was published in Volume III of the Fourth Series of the Collections of the Massachusetts Historical Society (1856), which volume is hosted by the Internet Archive. When the manuscript was returned to Massachusetts at the end of the 19th century, the Massachusetts legislature commissioned a new transcription to be published. While the version that resulted was more faithful to the idiosyncratic orthography of Bradford, it contained, according to Morison, many of the same mistakes as the transcription published in 1856. The legislature's version was published in 1898. A copy is hosted by the Internet Archive. That version was the basis of the annotated version published as Davis, William T., ed. (1908). Bradford's History of Plymouth Plantation, 1606–1646. New York: C. Scribner's Sons. The 1982 Barnes & Noble reprint of this edition can be found online at HathiTrust. A digitized version with most of Davis's annotations and notes removed is hosted at the University of Maryland's Early Americas Digital Archive. The most amply annotated and literally transcribed edition of the work is Ford 1912. The history of the manuscript is described in the Editorial Preface to the 1856 publication by the Massachusetts Historical Society and more fully in the Introduction of Morison's edition (pp. xxvii–xl), which also contains a history of the published editions of the manuscript (pp. xl–xliii).
- Brereton, John (1602). A Brief and true Relation of the Discoverie of the North Part of Virginia …. London: Georg. Bishop. A facsimile reprint with introduction by Luther S. Livingston and published by Dodd, Mead & Co. in 1903 is hosted by the Internet Archive. A digitized version (with page numbers) is also hosted by the University of Michigan. An annotated version can also be found in Burrage 1906, pp. 353–94.
- Brinley, Francis (1798). "A Brief Account of the Several Settlements and Governments in and about the lands of the Narragansett Bay Bay in New England". Collections of the Massachusetts Historical Society. 5: 216–220.
- Champlain, Samuel de (1878–82). Slafter, Edmund F. (ed.). Title Voyages of Samuel de Champlain. Translated by Otis, Charles Pomeroy. Boston: The Prince Society. LCCN 03017624. Hosted by Internet Archives: Volume I; 1567–35 (1880); Volume II: 1604–1610 (1878); Volume III: 1611–1618 (1882).
- Cushman, Robert (1622a). A sermon preached at Plimmoth in New-England December 9. 1621 …. London: Printed by I[ohn] D[awson] for Iohn Bellamie. Reprinted in Cushman, Robert (1858). The First Sermon Ever Preached in New England …. New York: J.E.D. Comstock.
- Cushman, Robert (1622b). "Reasons & considerations touching the lawfulnesse of removing out of England into the parts of America". A relation, or, Journall of the beginning and proceedings of the English plantation setled at Plimoth in New England, by certaine English adventurers both merchants and others …. London: Printed for John Bellamie. pp. 60–72.
- Gookin, Daniel (1792). "Historical Collections of the Indians in New England". Collections of the Massachusetts Historical Society. 3rd series. 1: 141–229. (Reprint of 1674 manuscript.)
- Gorges, Ferdinando (1622). A briefe relation of the discovery and plantation of Nevv England …. London: Printed by John Haviland, and are to be sold by William Bladen. Published under the authorship of "Plymouth Council for New England". This work was published in Purchas 1625, pp. IV:1827–1832 (in the 1905–07 reprint it is found volume 19, pp. 269–284 and reprinted by the Massachusetts Historical Society as Gorges, Ferdinando (1832). "A Brief Relation of the Discovery and Plantation of New England". Collections of the Massachusetts Historical Society. 2nd series. 9: 1–25. The booklet was also reprinted in Baxter 1890, pp. I:199–240.
- Gorges, Ferdinando (1658). A Briefe Narration of the Originall Undertakings for the Advancement of Plantations into the Parts of America. London: Printed by E. Beudenell for Nath. Brook. This pamphlet was reprinted by the Massachusetts Historical Society as Gorges, Ferdinando (1837). "A Briefe Narration of the Originall Undertakings for the Advancement of Plantations into the Parts of America". Collections of the Massachusetts Historical Society. 3rd series. 6: 45–93. (Hosted by the Internet Archive.) And by the Maine Historical Society as Gorges, Ferdinando (1847). "A Briefe Narration …". Collections of the Maine Historical Society. Collections of the Maine Historical Society; v. 2: [v]–xiv, [15]–71. (Hosted online by the HathiTrust.) It is also reprinted in Baxter 1890, pp. II:1–81.
- Hubbard, William (1677). A Narrative of the Troubles with the Indians in New-England, from the First Planting thereof in the year 1607. to this Present Year 1677. But Chiefly of the Late Troubles in the Two Last Years, 1675. and 1676. To which is added a discourse about the warre with the Pequods in the year 1637. Boston: Printed by John Foster. LCCN 03026260. This volume was reprinted and annotated as Drake 1865.
- Johnson, Edward (1654). Wonder-Working Providence of Sions Saviour in New England. London: Printed for Nath: Brooke. A facsiile copy of the work (with original page numbers) is reproduced in the second volume of Poole, William Frederick, ed. (1867). Wonder-Working Providence of Sions Saviour in New England. Andover, Massachusetts: W. F. Draper. This work is hosted by Hathitrust: Volume I and Volume II.
- Morton, Nathaniel (1669). New Englands Memorial. Cambridge: S.G. and M.J. for John Ulster of Boston. A facsimile reproduction is contained in Lord, Arthur, ed. (1903). New Englands Memorial. Boston: The Club of Odd Volumes. An early annotated edition is Davis, John, ed. (1826). New-England's Memorial by Nathaniel Morton. Boston: Crocker & Brewster. This book is largely based on the manuscript Of Plymouth Plantation by William Bradford, Morton's uncle.
- Morton, Thomas (1637). New English Canaan, or New Canaan. Amsterdam: Jacob Frederick Stam., an annotated version of which, retaining the original orthography, is contained, together with introductory matter and notes, in Adams, Charles Frances Jr., ed. (1883). New England Canaan of Thomas Morton. Boston: The Prince Society.
- Mourt's Relation (1622). A relation, or, Journall of the beginning and proceedings of the English plantation setled at Plimoth in New England, by certaine English adventurers both merchants and others …. London: Printed for John Bellamie. This work (the authors of which are not credited) is commonly called Mourt's Relation, and is generally accepted to have been written by William Bradford and Edward Winslow (as to the narrative parts) and Robert Cushman (as to the religious and promotional parts). An annotated version was first printed in Young 1841, pp. 109–251. Another annotated version is Dexter, Henry Martyn, ed. (1865). Mourt's Relation or Journal of the Plantation at Plymouth. Boston: John Kimball Wiggin – via Internet Archive. Several different copies of that book are also hosted by HathiTrust. A version with contemporary orthography and comments was published in connection with the Plimouth Plantation, Inc. as Heath, Dwight B., ed. (1963). Mourt's Relation: A Journal of the Pilgrims at Plymouth. Bedford, Massachusetts: Applewood Books. ISBN 0918222842.
- Pratt, Phineas (1858). "A Declaration of the Affairs of the English People that First Inhabited New England". Collections of the Massachusetts Historical Society. 4. 4: 474–87.
- Purchas, Samuel, ed. (1625). Hakluytus posthumus, or, Purchas his Pilgrimes. Contayning a history of the world, in sea voyages, & lande-travells, by Englishmen and others …. London: Imprinted for H. Fetherston. The original imprint was "In fower parts, each containing five bookes". All four volumes (parts) are hosted online by the Library of Congress The 1905–07 reproduction was printed in 20 volumves (one for each "book"): Purchas, Samuel, ed. (1905). Hakluytus posthumus. Works issued by the Hakluyt Society. Extra series; no. 14-33. Glasgow: J. MacLehose and Sons.
- Rosier, James (1605). A True Relation of the most prosperous voyage made this present yeere 1605, by Captaine George Waymouth, in the discovery of the land of Virginia. London: Geor. Bishop. The pamphlet was reprinted in an 1877 edition hosted online by HathiTrust. It is reprinted with annotations at Burrage 1906, pp. 357–94.
- Smith, John (1616). A description of New England: or The observations, and discoveries, of Captain John Smith (admirall of that country) in the north of America, in the year of our Lord 1614. London: Printed by Humfrey Lownes, for Robert Clerke. This book is reprinted in Arber 1910, pp. 175–232. A digitized version can be downloaded from The Digital Commons at University of Nebraska–Lincoln.
- Smith, John (1620). New Englands trials. London: Printed by William Jones.
- Smith, John (1624). The generall historie of Virginia, New England & the Summer Isles. London: Printed by I.D. and I.H. for Michael Sparkes.. Macmillan published a verbatim version of the first printing (with different pagination) of this work as well as Smith's 1630 autobiography and his Sea Grammar: Smith, John (1907). The generall historie of Virginia, New England & the Summer Isles: together with The true travels, adventures and observations, and A sea grammar. New York: Macmillan. The Macmillan version, is hosted by the Library of Congress in two volumes): Volume I and Volume II. A searchable version (with various download options) of the same book is hosted by the Internet Archive: Volume I and Volume II. The Generall History of Virginia is also contained in Arber 1910, pp. I:273–38, II:385–784. The work was twice republished in Smith's life (in 1726 and 1727) and immediately after his death (in 1732).
- Smith, John (1631). Advertisement for the unexperienced Planters of New-England, or anywhere. London: John Haviland.
- Whitmore, W.H., ed. (1867). John Dunton's Letters from New England. Boston: Printed for the Prince Society by T.R. Marvin & Son.
- Williams, Roger (1643). A key into the language of America: or, An help to the language of the natives in that part of America, called New-England. London: Printed by Gregory Dexter. A digitized version with modern typeface but 1643 pagination is hosted by the University of Michigan.
- Winslow, Edward (1624). Good newes from New-England: or, A true relation of things very remarkable at the plantation of Plimoth in New-England … Together with a relation of such religious and civill lawes and customes, as are in practise amongst the Indians …. London: Printed by I. D[awson and Eliot's Court Press] for William Bladen and John Bellamie. The work is reprinted, with annotations, in Young 1841, pp. 269–375.
- Wood, William (1634). New Englands Prospect. London: Tho. Coates for John Bellamie. A facsimile reproduction, with original pagination, is printed in an 1865 edition, together with a new preface and one from a 1764 reprinting, by The Society of Boston and hosted by the Internet Archive.

==== Secondary ====
- Adams, Charles Francis (1892). Three Episodes of Massachusetts History. Boston: Houghton, Mifflin and Company. Online (via HathiTrust): Multiple copies. ("The Settlement of Boston Bay" is found in Volume 1, pp. 1–360. The chapter on Tisquantum is found at pp. 23–44.)
- Adolf, Leonard A. (Summer 1964). "Squanto's Role in Pilgrim Diplomacy". Ethnohistory. 11 (3): 247–61. doi:10.2307/480471. JSTOR 480471.
- Arber, Edward, ed. (1910). Travels and Works of Captain John Smith. Edinburgh: John Grant. Hosted online by the Internet Archive: Volume I and Volume II.
- Bartlett, John Russell, ed. (1963). The Complete Writings of Roger Williams. Vol. 6. New York: Russell & Russell Inc. LCCN 63011034.
- Axtell, James (January 1978). "The Ethnohistory of Early America: A Review Essay". William and Mary Quarterly. 35 (1): 110–44. doi:10.2307/1922574. JSTOR 1922574.
- Bancroft, George (1862). History of the United States, from the Discovery of the American Continent: History of the Colonization of the United States. Vol. 1. Boston, Massachusetts: Little, Brown, & Co.
- Baxter, James Phinney (1890). Sir Ferdinando Gorges and his Province of Maine. Boston: The Prince Society. In three volumes, online, at the Internet Archive, as follows: Volume 1 consists of Baxter's memoir of Sir Ferdinando Gorges and A briefe relation of the discovery and plantation of New England ... (London: J. Haviland for W. Bladen, 1622). Volume 2 includes A briefe narration of the original undertakings of the advancement of plantation into the parts of American... by ... Sir Ferdinando Gorges ... (London: E. Brudenell, for N. Brook, 1658) as well as other works of Gorges and his son Thomas Gorges. Volume 3 is devoted to Gorges's letters and other papers, 1596–1646.
- Baylies, Francis (1830). An Historical Memoir of the Colony of New Plymouth. Vol. 1—Part the First (From 1620 to 1641). Boston: Hilliard, Gray, Little, and Wilkins.
- Bennett, M.K. (October 1955). "The Food Economy of the New England Indians, 1605–75". Journal of Political Economy. 63 (5): 369–397. doi:10.1086/257706. JSTOR 1826569. S2CID 154207490.
- Bicknell, Thomas W. (1908). Sowams: With Ancient Records of Sowams and Parts Adjacent—Illustrated. New Haven, Connecticut: Associated Publishers of American Records. LCCN 08019182.
- Bragdon, Kathleen J. (1996). Native People of Southern New England, 1650–1775. Norman, Oklahoma: University of Oklahoma Press. ISBN 0806140046.
- Brown, Alexander (1897). Genesis of the United States. Vol. 1. Boston: Houghton, Mifflin and Co.
- Burrage, Henry S., ed. (1906). Early English and French voyages, chiefly from Hakluyt, 1534–1608. New York: Charles Scribner's Sons. (The work consists of first-hand accounts of early voyages to the New World, with introduction and notes by Burrage.)
- Burrage, Henry S. (1914). The Beginnings of Colonial Maine, 1602-1658. Portland, Mainee: Printed for the state. LCCN 14008527.
- Ceci, Lynn (April 4, 1975). "Fish Fertilizer: A Native North American Practice?". Science. 188 (4183): 26–30. Bibcode:1975Sci...188...26C. doi:10.1126/science.188.4183.26. JSTOR 1740002. PMID 17760151. S2CID 6097798.
- Ceci, Lynn (September 19, 1975). "Letter: Indian Corn Cultivation". Science. 189 (4207): 946–50. doi:10.1126/science.189.4207.946-b. JSTOR 1740631. PMID 17789139.
- Ceci, Lynn (1990). "Squanto and the Pilgrims: On Planting Corn 'in the manner of the Indians'". In Clifton, James A. (ed.). The Invented Indian: Cultural Fictions and Government Policies. New Brunswick, New Jersey: Transaction Publishers. pp. 71–89. ISBN 0887383416.
- Cell, Gillian T. (October 1965). "The Newfoundland Company: A Study of Subscribers to a Colonizing Venture". William and Mary Quarterly. 22 (4): 611–25. doi:10.2307/1922912. JSTOR 1922912.
- Chamberlain, Alexander F. (October–December 1902). "Algonkian Words in American English: A Study in the Contact of the White Man and the Indian". The Journal of American Folklore. 15 (59): 240–67. doi:10.2307/533199. JSTOR 533199.
- Chase, Henry E. (1885). "Notes on the Wampanoag Indians". Annual Report of the Smithsonian Institution for the Year 1883. Washington, D.C.: Government Printing Office: 878–907.
- Cook, Sherburne F. (September 1973). "The Significance of Disease in the Extinction of the New England Indians". Human Biology. 45 (3): 485–508. JSTOR 41459892. PMID 4584337.
- Crosby, Alfred W. (April 1976). "Virgin Soil Epidemics as a Factor in the Aboriginal Depopulation in America". William and Mary Quarterly. 33 (2): 289–99. doi:10.2307/1922166. JSTOR 1922166. PMID 11633588.
- De Forest, John William (1851). History of the Indians of Connecticut from the Earliest Known Period to 1850. Hartford, Connecticut: Wm. Jas. Hamersley. LCCN 02015045.
- Dean, John Ward, ed. (1887). Capt. John Mason, the Founder of New Hampshire. Boston: The Prince Society. (A copy is also hosted by the HathiTrust.)
- Deane, Charles (March 1885). "Indians Kidnapped from Maine". Proceedings of the Massachusetts Historical Society. 2nd. 2: 35–38. JSTOR 25079636.
- Deetz, James; Deetz, Patricia E. Scott (2000). The Times of Their Lives: Life, Love, and Death in Plymouth Colony. New York: Random House. ISBN 0716738309.
- Dockstader, Frederick J. (1977). Great North American Indians: Profiles in Life and Leadership. New York: Van Nostrand Reinhold. ISBN 0442021488.
- Drake, Samuel G. (1845). The Book of the Indians, or, Biography and History of the Indians of North America from its First Discovery to the Year 1841 (9th ed.). Boston: Benjamin B. Mussey. ISBN 9780665373534.
- Drake, Samuel G., ed. (1865). The History of the Indian Wars in New England. Roxbury, Massachusetts: Printed for W. Elliot Woodward. LCCN 02015135. Hosted by the Internet Archive in two volumes: Volume I and Volume II.
- Dunn, Jerome P. (Spring 1993). "Squanto Before He Met the Pilgrims". Bulletin of the Massachusetts Archaeological Society. 54 (1): 38–42.
- Ford, Worthington C. (1912). History of Plymouth Plantation 1620–1647. Boston: Houghton, Mifflin Company for The Massachusetts Historical Society. LCCN 12029493. The work is in two volumes hosted on the Internet Archive as Volume I and Volume II.
- Goddard, Ives (1978). "Eastern Algonquian Languages". In Trigger, Bruce G. (ed.). Northeast. Handbook of North American Indians. Vol. 15. Washington, D.C.: Smithsonian Institution. pp. 70–77. ISBN 0160045754. (William C. Sturtevant, general editor.)
- Green, Samuel Abbott (1881). History of Medicine in Massachusetts: A Centennial Address Delivered before the Massachusetts Medical Society. Boston: A. Williams & Co.
- Herndon, G. Melvin (July 1967). "Indian Agriculture in the Southern Colonies". The North Carolina Historical Review. 44 (3): 283–97. JSTOR 23517891.
- Hobsbawm, Eric; Ranger, Terence, eds. (1983). The Invention of Tradition. Cambridge, United KingdomCambridge University Press. ISBN 0521246458.
- Holmes, Oliver Wendell Sr. (1891). "The Medical Profession in Massachusetts". Medical Essays, 1842-1882. Riverside edition. The writings of Oliver Wendell Holmes ... Vol. IX. Boston: Houghton, Mifflin and Company. pp. 312–69. (This essay was originally a lecture delivered before the Lowell Institute, January 29, 1869.)
- Hoyt, Epaphras (1824). Antiquarian Researches: Comprising a History of the Indian Wars in the Country Bordering Connecticut River and Parts Adjacent …. Antiquarian researches or Indian wars. Greenfield, Massachusetts: A. Phelps.
- Humins, John H. (March 1987). "Squanto and Massasoit: A Struggle for Power". New England Quarterly. 60 (1): 54–70. doi:10.2307/365654. JSTOR 365654.
- Hutchinson, Thomas (1765). The History of the Colony of Massachusett's Bay: From the First Settlement Thereof in 1628, until its Incorporation with the Colony of Plimouth Province, Province of Main etc., by the Charter of King William and Queen Mary in 1691. Vol. 1 (2d ed.). Boston: Printed for Mr. Richardson. First of three volumes.
- James, Sydney V. Jr., ed. (1963). Three Visitors to Early Plymouth. Plymouth, Massachusetts: Plimouth Plantation, Inc. LCCN 66008244.
- Jennings, Francis (1976). The Invasion of America: Indians, Colonialism, and the Cant of Conquest. New York: Norton. ISBN 0393008304.
- Kinnicutt, Lincoln N. (November 1914). "The Plymouth Settlement and Tisquantum". Proceedings of the Massachusetts Historical Society. 48: 103–118. JSTOR 25080029.
- Kinnicutt, Lincoln N. (October 1920). "Plymouth's Debt to the Indians". The Harvard Theological Review. 13 (4): 345–61. doi:10.1017/s0017816000029916. JSTOR 1507717. S2CID 159526670.
- Knapp, Samuel L. (1836). The Library of American History. New York: C.J. Jackson & Co.
- Kruer, Matthew (Spring–Summer 2003). "A Country Wonderfully Prepared for their Entertainment: The Aftermath of the New England Indian Epidemic of 1616". Journal of the National Collegiate Honors Council (129).
- Kupperman, Karen Ordahl (December 1977). "Thomas Morton, Historian". The New England Quarterly. 50 (4): 660–64. doi:10.2307/364252. JSTOR 364252.
- Kupperman, Karen Ordahl (2000). Indians and English: Facing Off in Early America. Ithaca, New York: Cornell University Press. ISBN 0801431786.
- Levermore, Charles Herbert, ed. (1912). Forerunners and Competitors of the Pilgrims and Puritans: or, Narratives of Voyages Made by Persons Other than the Pilgrims and Puritans of the Bay Colony to the Shores of New England during the First Quarter of the Seventeenth Century, 1601–1625, with Especial Reference to the Labors of Captain John Smith in Behalf of the Settlement of New England. Brooklyn, New York: The Society [New England Society of Brooklyn]. LCCN a17000511. The work is hosted on the Internet Archive: Volume 1 and Volume II.
- McManis, Douglas (1972). European Impressions of the New England Coast, 1497–1620. Chicago, Illinois: University of Chicago, Department of Geography. ISBN 0890650462.
- Major, Minor Wallace (Fall 1970). "William Bradford versus Thomas Morton". Early American Literature. 5 (2): 1–13. JSTOR 25070464.
- Mann, Charles C. (December 2005). "Native Intelligence". Smithsonian Magazine.
- Marr, John S.; Cathey, John T. (2010). "New Hypothesis for Cause of an Epidemic among Native Americans, New England, 1616–1619". Emerging Infectious Diseases. 16 (2): 281–86. doi:10.3201/eid1602.090276. PMC 2957993. PMID 20113559.
- Mather, Cotton (1855) [1702]. Magnalia Christi Americana. Vol. 1. Hartford, Connecticut: S. Andrus & Son. ISBN 9780665448713. LCCN nuc87620072.
- Martin, Calvin (1978). Keepers of the Game: Indian-Animal Relationships and the Fur Trade. Berkeley, California: University of California Press. ISBN 0520035194.
- Matthews, Albert (1904). "Note on the Indian Sagamore Samoset". Publications of the Colonial Society of Massachusetts. 6: 59–70.
- Mood, Fulmer (March 1937). "John Winthrop, Jr., on Indian Corn". The New England Quarterly. 1 (1): 121–33. doi:10.2307/360150. JSTOR 360150.
- Morison, Samuel Eliot (1956). The Story of the "Old Colony" of New Plymouth, 1620–1692. New York: Knopf. LCCN 56008893.
- Nanepashemet (1993). "It Smells Fishy to Me: An Argument Supporting the Use of Fish Fertilizer by the Native People of Southern New England". In Benes, Peter; Benes, Jane Montague (eds.). Algonkians of New England: Past and Present. Annual proceedings, Dublin Seminar for New England Folklife (1991). Boston, Massachusetts: Boston University. pp. 42–50.
- Nickerson, Warren Sears (1994). Carpenter, Delores Bird (ed.). Early Encounters—Native Americans and Europeans in New England: From the Papers of W. Sears Nickerson. East Lansing, Michigan: Michigan State University Press. ISBN 0870133519.
- Philbrick, Nathaniel (2006). Mayflower: A Story of Courage, Community, and War. New York: Viking. ISBN 0670037605.
- Pope, Peter Edward (2004). Fish into Wine: The Newfoundland Plantation in the Seventeenth Century. Chapel Hill, North Carolina: For the Omohundro Institute of Early American History and Culture, Williamsburg, Virginia by the University of North Carolina Press. ISBN 9781469601175.
- Prince, Thomas (1826). A Chronological History of New England in the Form of Annals (New ed.). Boston: Cummings, Hilliard & Co.
- Prowse, D.W. (1895). A History of Newfoundland from the English, Colonial, and Foreign Records. New York: Macmillan. LCCN 10014021.
- Pulsipher, Jenny Hale (2005). Subjects unto the Same King: Indians, English, and the Contest for Authority in Colonial New England. Philadelphia, Pennsylvania: University of Pennsylvania Press. ISBN 0812238761.
- Quinn, D.B. (1960). "Edward Hayes, Liverpool Colonial Pioneer" (PDF). Transactions of the Historic Society of Lancashire and Cheshire. 111: 25–45. Archived from the original (PDF) on December 21, 2016.
- Rainey, Froelich G. (April 1936). "A Compilation of Historical Data Contributing to the Ethnography of Connecticut and Southern New England Indians". Bulletin of the Archeological Society of Connecticut. 3: 3–49.
- Robbins, Maurice (July 1956). "Indians of the Old Colony: Their Relation with and their Contribution to the Settlement of the Area". Bulletin of the Massachusetts Archaeological Society. 17 (4): 59–74.
- Rostlund, Erhardt (1957). "The Evidence for the Use of Fish as Fertilizer in Aboriginal North America". Journal of Geography. 56 (5): 222–228. Bibcode:1957JGeog..56..222R. doi:10.1080/00221345708983142.
- Ruiz, Purificacion (July 2023). "Málaga, Squanto, y el día de acción de gracias". Sociedad, Boletín de la Sociedad de Amigos de la Cultura de Vélez Málaga. Número 20/21: 89–94.
- Russell, Howard S. (1969–70). "New England Agriculture from Champlain and Others". Bulletin of the Massachusetts Archaeological Society. 31 (1–2): 11–18.
- Russell, Howard S. (September 19, 1975). "Letter: Indian Corn Cultivation". Science. 189 (4207): 944–46. doi:10.1126/science.189.4207.944-a. PMID 17789137. S2CID 32151831.
- Russell, Howard S. (1980). Indian New England before the Mayflower. Hanover, New Hampshire: University Press of New England. ISBN 0874511623.
- Salisbury, Neal (1981). "Squanto: Last of the Patuxets". In Sweet, David G.; Nash, Gary B. (eds.). Struggle and Survival in Colonial America. Berkeley, California: University of California Press. pp. 228–45. ISBN 0520041100.
- Salisbury, Neal (1982). Manitou and Providence: Indians, Europeans, and the Making of New England, 1500–1643. New York: Oxford University Press. ISBN 0195034546.
- Salwen, Bert (1978). "Indians of Southern New England and Long Island: Early Period". In Trigger, Bruce G. (ed.). Northeast. Handbook of North American Indians. Vol. 15. Washington, D.C.: Smithsonian Institution. pp. 160–76. ISBN 0160045754. (William C. Sturtevant, general editor.)
- Shuffelton, Frank (March 1976). "Indian Devils and Pilgrim Fathers: Squanto, Hobomok, and the English Conception of Indian Religion". New England Quarterly. 49 (1): 108–16. doi:10.2307/364560. JSTOR 364560.
- Simmons, William (1986). Spirit of the New England Tribes: Indian History and Folklore, 1620–1984. Hanover, New Hampshire: University Press of New England. ISBN 0874513707.
- Snow, Dear R.; Lanphear, Kim M. (Winter 1988). "European Contact and Indian Depopulation in the Northeast: The Timing of the First Epidemics". Ethnohistory. 35 (1): 15–33. doi:10.2307/482431. JSTOR 482431.
- Sylvester, Herbert Milton (1910). Indian Wars of New England. Vol. 1. Boston: W.B. Clarke Co. LCCN 10027624.
- Tolman, Adams (1902). "Indian Relics in Concord". Publications of the Concord Antiquarian Society. 10.
- Tomlins, Christophr L. (2010). Freedom Bound: Law, Labor, and Civic Identity in Colonizing English America, 1580-1865. Cambridge, U.K.: Cambridge University Press. ISBN 9780521761390.
- Trumbull, J. Hammond, ed. (1859). The Public Records of the Colony of Connecticut, May, 1678 – June 1689. Vol. 3. Hartford, Connecticut: Press of Case, Lockwood & Co.
- Vaughan, Alden T. (1995). New England Frontier: Puritans and Indians, 1620–1675 (3rd ed.). Norman, Oklahoma: University of Oklahoma Press. ISBN 080612718X.
- Warden, G.B. (September 19, 1975). "Letter: Indian Corn Cultivation". Science. 189 (4207): 946. doi:10.1126/science.189.4207.946. JSTOR 1740631. PMID 17789141.
- Weston, Thomas (1906). History of the Town of Middleboro, Massachusetts 1669–1905. Boston: Houghton, Mifflin and Company. LCCN 06023056.
- Williams, Herbert Upham (1909). The Epidemic of the Indians of New England, 1616-1620, with Remarks on Native American Infections. n.p. This is a reprint of an article by the same name published in Johns Hopkins Hospital Bulletin. 20 (224): 340–49 (November 1909).
- Williamson, William D. (1839). History of the State of Maine; From its First Discovery, A.D. 1602, to the Separation, A.D. 1820, Inclusive. Vol. 1. Hallowell: Glazier, Masters & Smith.
- Willison, George F. (1945). Saints and Strangers. New York: Reynal & Hitchcock. LCCN 45006745//r83.
- Young, Alexander, ed. (1841). Chronicles of the Pilgrim Fathers of the Colony of Plymouth, from 1602–1625. Boston: C. C. Little and J. Brown. LCCN 01012110. Da Capo published a facsimile reprinting of this volume in 1971.
