= Pocasset village =

Historical Native American village in Rhode Island and Massachusetts

Coordinates: 41.665°N 71.188°W

Pocasset was a former Wampanoag settlement, located between present-day Tiverton in Newport County, Rhode Island, and Fall River in Bristol County, Massachusetts. Pocasset is also the band of Wampanoag who lived in the settlement.

This village site should not be confused with Pocasset, Massachusetts, a census-designated place within the town of Bourne in Barnstable County, Massachusetts, about 50 miles east of this Pocasset. The site of Bourne, Massasschusetts was first a Praying Town settled in 1674, possibly also known as Pispogutt.

== Name ==
Pocasset is a Wôpanâak name which translates as "Where a strait widens out." It is also spelled Paugusset, Pocasicke, Pocasett, Pocassitt, Pokeesett, and Powakasick.

They were also called the Troy Indians, Weetemore Indians, and Fall River Indians historically.

== History ==
=== Precontact ===
The area is part of the Sapowet Point-Almy Brook Area which contains more than 40 archaeological sites, dating back to 4000 years ago.

=== 17th century ===
From about 1618 to 1630, Corbitant (c. 1595 – 1630) was the Sachem of Pocasset.

In 1659, the Plymouth Colony purchased Wampanoag lands near Fall River from Wamsutta (c. 1634 – 1662), the Wampanoag Sachem, in the "Freeman's Purchase." Wamsutta was the brother of Metacomet (Wampanoag, 1638–1676), also known as King Philip.

In the 1670s, Weetamoo (Wampanoag, c. 1635 – 1676), a Sunksqua or female Sachem, governed the nation. She was the daughter of Corbitant and widow of Wamsutta.

Leading up to the King Philip's War in 1675–1676, the Pocasset population "were so numerous that her armed men, able to go out upon the war path, were supposed to number three hundred." British colonists encroached on Wampanoag land and cleared forests, which reduced local game for subsistence. When war broke out, Weetamoo sent warriors in support of Metacomet. Her husband at the time, Petonanuit, sided with the English, and his followers became the Fall River Indian settlement.

A skirmish took place near the village between the Pocasset warriors and the English and their Fall River Indian volunteers, under the command of Colonel Benjamin Church.

Weetamoo drowned in the Tehticut River while fleeing English soldiers in 1676. Immediately after the fighting, the Pocasset fled to Narragansett territory for temporary refuge from the English.

After the battle, the Plymouth Colony allowed the Fall River Indians who fought under Church to settle among the English colonists. In 1679 and 1680, the Colony of New Plymouth bought the "Pocasset Purchase."

== Notable Pocasset ==
- Corbitant (c. 1595 – 1630), sachem
- Westamore (c. 1635 – 1676), sunksqua

== See also ==
- Hazard Farmstead (Joyner Site RI-706), ancient Indigenous site in Rhode Island
