= Weetamoo =

Native American leader

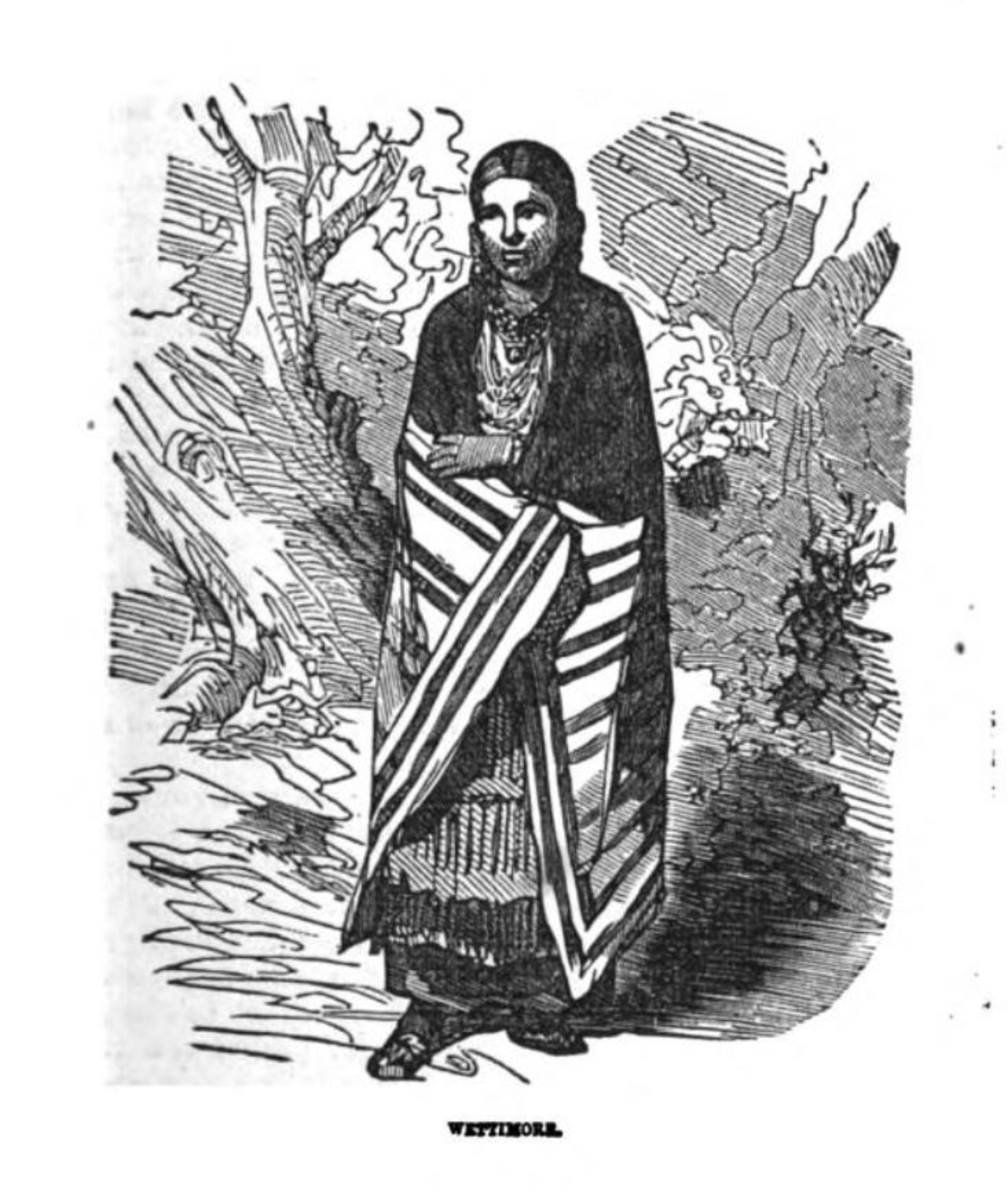

Pocasset Wampanoag leader
- In office Unknown – 1676
- Preceded by: Corbitant

Personal details
- Born: Namumpum Weetamoo; 1635 present day North Tiverton, Rhode Island
- Died: August 6, 1676 (aged 40–41) Taunton, Massachusetts
- Cause of death: Drowning
- Spouse(s): Winnepurket, Wamsutta (Alexander), Quequequanachet, Petonowit, and Quinnapin
- Parent: Corbitant (father)
- Nicknames: Weetamoe; Wenunchus; Tatapanunum

Military service
- Battles/wars: King Philip's War

Weetamoo (pronounced Wee-TAH-moo) (c. 1635–1676), also referred to as Weethao, Weetamoe, Wattimore, Namumpum, and Tatapanunum, was the leader of Pocasset Nation of the Wampanoag Confederacy. She was the Sunksqua, or female Sachem, of the Pocasset, which occupied contemporary Tiverton, Rhode Island in 1620.

== Early life ==
Weetamoo was born in the Mattapoiset village of the Pokanoket or around the Taunton River. Her father was Corbitant and he was Sachem of the Pocasset from c. 1618 to 1630. She had a younger sister named Wootonekanuske and no brothers. From an early age, Weetamoo was exposed to the diplomatic duties of her father and ended up adopting his views regarding the colonists. Unlike other sachems of the time, Corbitant rejected colonist and native relations. He believed that the land should remain in the hands of Native Americans and that the colonists must abandon the territory.

Weetamoo was close friends with leaders of the other nations, which later enabled her to form alliances during her reign. One of her close friends was Awashonks, female sachem of the Sakonnet. From a young age she was acquainted with Wamsutta and Metacomet, the sons of Massasoit, the leader of the Wampanoag. They would both play an important part in Weetamoo's adult life.

Weetamoo went on a vision quest that "kills the child soul", which is a rite of passage for males. Weetamoo is an early example of gender fluidity, performing duties of both men and women. She learned how to build permanent and temporary shelters, grow crops, prepare hides, hunt small animals, fish, and cook. Weetamoo was also trained to fight and learned diplomacy and leadership by observing her father and other elders like Massasoit.

== Husbands and children ==
During her lifetime, Weetamoo had at least five husbands: Winnepurket, Wamsutta (Alexander), Quequequanachet, Petonowit, and Quinnapin. However, multiple sources only acknowledge Weetamoo's marriages to Wamsutta, Petonowit, and Quinnapin. Her husbands were chosen for political alliances.

Her first husband, Winnepurket, was the Sachem of Saugus, Massachusetts and died shortly after they were married.

Her second husband, Wamsutta (alternatively known by the English as Alexander, a name which he retained until his death in 1662) was the eldest son of Massasoit, grand Sachem of the Wampanoag and participant in the first Thanksgiving with the Pilgrims. They were married in or before 1653, [it is speculated that] she had one child with Wamsutta, although the date of birth and name are unknown. After Massasoit's death, Wamsutta became the Sachem of the Wampanoag. This elevated Weetamoo's status as Sachem of the Pocasset and wife of the Sachem of the Wampanoag. Weetamoo continued to have the rights to her Pocasset sachemship after marriage. However, in 1662, Wamsutta attempted to sell her lands to Peter Talman from Rhode Island. Weetamoo challenged Wamsutta's decision to sell Pocasset land and appeared before the General Court of Plymouth. She made the claim that Wamsutta was selling Pocasset land unlawfully. She won her court appeals against her husband. During their marriage, the Wampanoag allied with the English against the Narragansett people, though the English later broke their treaty. Wamsutta became sick and died unexpectedly during negotiations with the English. His brother Metacom (Philip) succeeded him as Sachem of the Wampanoag. Metacom's wife was Weetamoo's sister, Wootonekanuske.

Little is known about Weetamoo's third husband Quequequanachet.

She ended the marriage to her fourth husband Petonowit/Petananuet (called "Ben" by the English) when he sided with the English during King Philip's War. In the summer of 1675, Petananuet met with Captain Benjamin Church of Plymouth as Wetamoos’ advisor. However, he was sharing with him information on Weetamoo. He informed Church that Wetamoo had attended a ritual dance hosted by Metacom with the intent to gain an alliance with her during King Philip's war. At this time both Metacom and the colonists were seeking her support. This information supported Church's suspicions that Weetamoo was siding with Metacom.

Her final marriage was to Quinnapin, the son of Niantic Narraganset Sachem Ninigret and grandson of powerful Narragansett Sachem Canonchet. He was described as "a handsome warrior" and they were married in August or September 1675. This marriage was designed to strengthen and reinforce the Wampanoag-Narragansett alliance against colonists. The marriage appeared to have been strong and the pair had at least one child together, who died in 1676. Quinnapin was captured in 1676.

== Political career ==
Because her father had no sons, she became Sunksqua between the death of her husband Wamsutta and her remarriage to Quequequanachet. Being a woman did not diminish her authority, despite many colonists' lack of understanding of her position. Weetamoo was depicted by Nathaniel Saltonstall from Massachusetts "as Potent a Prince as any round about her, and had as much Corn, Land, and Men, at her Command" as King Philip.

Weetamoo's leadership arose from her role as a cultivator of diplomacy.kin It has been theorized that some of the lesser-known Sachems assumed to have been male may have been female Sunksquas, especially since female leaders were not unheard of among the Algonquians. As a leader of her people Weetamoo traveled to different nations as an ambassador for the Wampanoag Confederacy. She was entrusted to represent Pocasset intertwined interests and sovereignty. By 1663, Weetamoo, had learned the colonial "deed games".Brooks

As tensions grew prior to King Philip's War, Weetamoo, was a highly sought after ally from both Metacom and the English.Martino-Trutor In the end, Weetamoo sided with Metacom and became his first ally in the war against the English. There are many speculations regarding the reasons why Weetamoo sided with Metacom. According to Saltonstall, she sided with Metacom out of revenge for the death of Wamsutta. According to Deputy Governor John Easton of Rhode Island, Weetamoo had serious considerations on siding with him but before they could form an alliance a group of English soldiers attacked her canoes in June 1675. The group of soldiers thought the canoes were Metacom's.Martino-Trutor This solidified Weetamoo's decision to ally with Metacom. In addition, Weetamoo forged alliances to fortify her authority and territorial integrity. Her strategy intertwining with other leaders and their families to protect those who depended on them.

‌Her role in King Philip's War was significantly decreased by the English particularly by Mary Rowlandson and Increase Mather. Mather often tried to reduce Weetamoo's power in his writings. However, in the communications he sent to London, Mather often described Weetamoo as a military threat of equal statue as Metacom. In reality, by 1675 Weetamoo was the leader of the coalition against the English settlers. In the summer of 1675, Weetamoo aided Metacom and his men during an English attack. She helped them escape through the swamps of Pocasset territory. After the escape, Weetamoo traveled to Narragansett territory seeking an alliance with them. It was during this visit that Weetamoo married Quinnapin. In February 1676, Weetamoo led a raid on the English in the Battle of Blood Rock that resulted in the capture of Mary Rowlandson. At the Battle of Blood Rock Weetamoo commanded an army of more than 300 warriors.

== Death ==
In 1676, the Native American coalition's defeat seemed near, and Weetamoo considered returning to her lands. At this point in the war, places like Pocasset swamps were no longer a safe hideout as they had become accessible to English troops. As well, Governor Josiah Winslow of Plymouth Colony had announced that all enemies of war should be disposed of as best seemed fit by Colonel Benjamin Church. One of the captive men, perhaps believing he could gain English favor and save his life, revealed the hideout of other war enemies to the English. By doing so, he betrayed Weetamoo and her location. During the ambush, all her men were killed. According to William Hubbard and Increase Mather, Weetamoo was able to escape the attack in a makeshift raft. However, as she made her escape, she drowned in the Taunton River. Mather found her death ironic, given that she drowned in the same river she had helped Metacom and his men escape early in the war.

Her body washed ashore in Swansea, which was a prominent English colony. The story of her corpse being beheaded comes from the writings of minister Increase Mather. In his 1676 "Brief History of the War with the Indians in New England," he provides a narrative of Weetamoo's final days. He describes the drowning, the beheading, and the exhibiting of her head. As well, he attributes her death as being brought by God.

The English were so afraid of Weetamoo's power that they cut off her head and mounted it on a pike. They left her head on display in front of a settlement in order to prove she really had died. Her head on display also stood as a trophy of the victory of the English in order to lower the spirit of her followers.

When the remaining Wampanoag people saw what the English had done, Increase Mather stated:

"They made a most horrible and diabolical lamentation, crying out that it was their queen's head. If to lament the sad end of their queen was diabolical on the part of the Indians, what was this cruel mockery of their grief by a Christian minister, and what had the heathen to gain by listening to his teachings, or adhering to his practice?"Peirce

== Legacy ==
Weetamoo/Wattimore appears in Mary Rowlandson's The Captivity and Restoration of Mrs. Mary Rowlandson. In 1676, Weetamoo and her husband Quinnapin, the Sachem of Narragansett, attacked a colonial settlement in Lancaster, Massachusetts in which they took Rowlandson as captive. It was during her captivity that Rowlandson interacted with Weetamoo and provided a narrative of her. However, Rowlandson's narrative includes multiple misunderstandings on Weetamoo's political power. During her time in captivity, Rowlandson considered Weetamoo as only one of Quinaapin's three wives with no political power of her own. This was due to Rowlandson's own puritan beliefs in terms of gender and women's roles.

Nevertheless, Rowlandson, who was captured and held by Quinnapin for three months, left a vivid description of Weetamoo's appearance as well as her personality:

A severe and proud dame she was, bestowing every day in dressing herself neat as much time as any of the gentry of the land: powdering her hair, and painting her face, going with necklaces, with jewels in her ears, and bracelets upon her hands. When she had dressed herself, her work was to make girdles of wampum and beads.

Only women of rank were allowed to produce "girdles of wampum and beads", and Weetamoo's production of these items reinforced her status. Wampum belts would be strung together with shells and were often used some Native Americans to deliver messages accompanied by speeches. Under Algonquian law, Wampum and beads were wealth and power. To Rowlandson, they were accessories that Weetamoo used as part of a feminized ritual that showed her vanity. Additionally, by labeling Weetamoo as a dame, Rowlandson sought to ridiculice Native American women and their attempt to fit the image of aristocratic women and European fashion.

There have been many attempts to diminish Weetamoo's role in King Philip's war. One example can be seen in a painting called Weetamoo Swimming the Mattapoisett. In the painting, Weetamoo is depicted as running away from battle with a facial expression showing fear. She is naked and seems to be drowning. Such an image represents the attempts to diminish the power she had as a Sachem of the Pocasset.

Regardless of those attempts, there has also been positive changes in the way Weetamoo is remembered as a powerful Sachem of the Pocasset.

Many places in the White Mountains of New Hampshire are also named after her, such as Weetamoo Falls, Mount Weetamoo, the Weetamoo Trail (which includes Weetamoo Glen and Weetamoo Rock), and the Six Husbands Trail, a reference to her marriages. However, there is no evidence that Weetamoo ever went to the White Mountains, and the area's focus on her may come from John Greenleaf Whittier's poem "The Bridal of Penacook," which names her as being from the area.

Weetamoo's adolescent life is depicted in the young adult historical novel, Weetamoo: Heart of the Pocasetts, in The Royal Diaries series.

Weetamoo Woods Open Space in Tiverton, Rhode Island is named after Weetamoo. A 50-foot vessel, Weetamoo, built in 1902, "was named after the daughter of an Indian Chief in John Greenleaf Whittier's poem Bride of Penacook." The vessel served on Lake Sunapee for 25 years before being scuttled. Lowell YWCA Camp Weetamoo is located on Long-Sought-for Pond in Westford, MA.

To the Wampanoag people Weetamoo was a Sunksqua, a bead worker, a dancer, a war chief, a storyteller, and so much more. Weetamoo was one of the best examples of smart and intelligent Sachems. She is also remembered for her remarkable beauty. Weetamoo was known as "Squaw Sachem." Weetamoo gained status among the Wampanoags by virtue of her having been the Queen of the Wampanoag.

== Sources ==
- Brooks, Lisa Tanya. (2018). Our Beloved Kin: A New History of King Philip’s War. Yale University Press.
- Clark Smith, Patricia. (2003). Weetamoo: Chief of the Pocassets. Scholastic.
- Martino-Trutor, Gina M. (2015). "As Potent a Prince as any Round About Her: Rethinking Weetamoo of the Pocassett and Native Female Leadership in Early America". Journal of Women's History. 27 (3): 37–60. doi:10.1353/jowh.2015.0032. S2CID 142629136.
- Martino-Trutor, Gina M. (2020). "Women Warriors and the Mobilization of Colonial Memory in the Nineteenth-Century United States" in Women Warriors and National Heroes: Global Histories, ed. Boyd Cothran, Joan Judge, and Adrian Shubert. Bloomsbury Academic. 93–112.
- Peirce, Ebenezer Weaver. (1878). Indian History, Biography and Genealogy: Pertaining To The Good Sachem Massasoit Of The Wampanoag Tribe, And His Descendants. Kessinger Publishing.
- Potter, Tiffany. (Winter 2003). "Writing Indigenous Femininity: Mary Rowlandson’s Narrative of Captivity." Eighteenth-Century Studies 36(2): 153–167.
- Rowlandson, Mary White. (1998). The Narrative of the Captivity and Restoration of Mrs. Mary Rowlandson: First Printed in 1682 at Cambridge, Massachusetts & London, England, Whereunto Are Annexed a Map of Her Removes & Biographical & Historical Notes. Sandwich: Chapman Billies, L.
