= The Old Glory =

Book by Robert Lowell

- 1st edition
- Author: Robert Lowell
- Cover artist: Frank Parker
- Language: English
- Genre: Drama
- Publisher: Farrar, Straus, and Giroux
- Publication date: 1965
- Publication place: United States
- Preceded by: For the Union Dead
- Followed by: Near the Ocean

The Old Glory is a play written by the American poet Robert Lowell that was first performed in 1964. It consists of three pieces that were meant to be performed together as a trilogy. The first two pieces, "Endecott and the Red Cross" and "My Kinsman, Major Molineux" were stage adaptations of short stories by Nathaniel Hawthorne, and the third piece, "Benito Cereno," was a stage adaptation of the novella by Herman Melville.

== Production history ==
The Old Glory was produced off-Broadway in New York City at The American Place Theatre in 1964 in the company's first production which starred Frank Langella, Roscoe Lee Browne, and Lester Rawlins and won five Obie Awards in 1965 including an award for "Best American Play" as well as awards for Langella, Brown and Rawlins. For this production, all three plays together ran too long and the director, Jonathan Miller, decided to cut the first piece, "Endecott and the Red Cross." However, in 1968, the American Place Theatre mounted a full production of "Endecott and the Red Cross" by itself, entitled The Old Glory: Endecott and the Red Cross, starring Spalding Gray and Kenneth Haigh.

In January 1965, Jean B. Webster, in association with the American Place Theatre, produced "Benito Cereno" by itself at the Theatre de Lys, off-Broadway. The cast featured Roscoe Lee Brown, Mark Lenard, James Patterson, and Jack Ryland; Jonathan Miller again directed.

The Old Glory was revived for a second off-Broadway production in 1976 in celebration of the United States Bicentennial. Then, in 2011, "Benito Cereno" was produced without the other two plays for an off-Broadway production at the Horizon Theater Rep.

=== Endecott and the Red Cross ===
The characters in this play include Mr. Blackstone, Thomas Morton, and Governor Endecott. The play is set in the 1630s in the settlement of Merrymount (which still exists today as a neighborhood within the city of Quincy, Massachusetts). The three main characters of Blackstone, Morton, and Endecott are based on real historical figures, and the plot is based upon real historical events. In his introduction to the published play, Robert Brustein writes, "In Endecott and the Red Cross, a mild-mannered Puritan military man, faced with high-living Anglican-Royalists in colonial America, is forced into shedding blood by political-religious expediency."

=== My Kinsman, Major Molineux ===
The characters in this play include Major Molineux, Colonel Greenough, Robin, and Robin's brother. The play is set in Boston, just as the American Revolution is about to erupt. In his introduction to the published play, Robert Brustein writes, "in My Kinsman, Major Molineux, the American Revolution unfolds as a violent nightmare experienced by two Deerfield youths seeking out their British cousin in Boston, 'the city of the dead'." Lowell's version of the story is more surrealistic and cartoonish than Hawthorne's original short story.

=== Benito Cereno ===
The characters in this play include Captain Amasa Delano, John Perkins, Benito Cereno, and Babo. It is set in 1799, aboard the American ship, The President Adams, and the Spanish ship, The San Dominick. The plot of the play concerns Captain Delano, an American in charge of a New England sealing ship, who encounters a Spanish slave ship while his ship is at harbor off the coast of Trinidad. The captain visits the Spanish ship (which is in total disarray) and eventually comes to realize that the slaves, under the leadership of a slave named Babo, have taken over the ship, killed the ship's captain and most of the crew, and are forcing one of the few remaining sailors, Benito Cereno, to help them sail back to Africa.

== Publication history ==
The Old Glory was first published by Farrar, Straus, and Giroux in 1965. A revised edition was published with minor changes in 1968. This edition included an introduction by Robert Brustein and a director's note by Jonathan Miller. Brustein called The Old Glory "a dramatic history of the American character," adding "Mr. Lowell feels the past working in his very bones...Adopting a style which is purposely chilling, measured, and remote, he has endowed his plays with flinty intelligence and tautened passion, making them work on the spectator with all the suggestive power of non-discursive poems." Before the book's title page, Lowell officially noted, "My sources have been Nathaniel Hawthorne's stories and sketches, Endecott and the Red Cross, The May-Pole of Merry Mount, and My Kinsman, Major Molineux; Thomas Morton's New Canaan; and Herman Melville's Benito Cereno."

== Composition history ==
Lowell's idea for The Old Glory began with his attempt to adapt Herman Melville's novella Benito Cereno into an opera for the Metropolitan Opera in New York City. In 1960, with the assistance of the poet William Meredith, Lowell received a grant from the Ford Foundation to write the libretto. However, because Lowell didn't have a background in opera or any musical training, he struggled with the project and was unable to deliver the libretto.

Although he tried to complete a libretto for over a year, in a July 1961 letter to his cousin, Harriet Winslow, he admitted that he was writing the piece "to satisfy my Ford [Foundation] opera grant, though I think of a play rather than anything that could be sung." And by the end of 1961, Lowell had largely abandoned the idea of writing a libretto and instead redirected his energy to writing the three dramatic theater pieces that would make up the play The Old Glory. He finished writing a first draft of his play by early 1962, and by 1963, he'd begun working with the English director Jonathan Miller who'd expressed an interest in directing The Old Glory in New York.

== Critical response ==
In 1964, Lowell's friend, the poet Randall Jarrell, praised "Benito Cereno" as "a masterpiece," and the poet W. D. Snodgrass wrote a positive review of the play in the New York Review of Books. In The New York Times review for the first performance of the show (in which "Endecott and the Red Cross" was left out), the theater critic Howard Taubman also praised "Benito Cereno" but was critical of "My Kinsman, Major Molineux" which he called "a pretentious, arty trifle." When "Endecott and the Red Cross" was produced in 1968, Clive Barnes of The New York Times wrote that, although the play was poetic and full of interesting ideas, he didn't think that the production or the writing were fully engaging on stage.

In a scholarly article on The Old Glory, Baruch Hochman praised all three plays, writing, "Lowell the dramatist matches Lowell the poet." In Hochman's interpretation, "The plays are not so much about the centrality of violence in American life as about the discords at the heart of civilization itself. As a trilogy, the plays examine the bond between the powers that oppress and the powers that seek to overthrow them."

In 1964, Ruth Herschberger wrote a controversial review of "Benito Cereno" in The Village Voice in which she accused Lowell of racism (a charge that has also been aimed at Herman Melville regarding his novella Benito Cereno), and she interpreted his play as being a statement against the civil rights movement. Lowell was horrified by the accusation and responded with the following letter to the editors of The Village Voice:

I am shocked by Ruth Herschberger's malicious account of my play Benito Cereno. . .It is perfectly clear that I am horrified by the American tendency to violence when in panic, and that is what the ending of my play--the killing of the slaves and their leader on the mutinied ship--means. . .Ruth Herschberger's notion that I am Captain Delano and wish to put down the present Negro revolt either by guns or by anything else is slanderous. In my poem "[For] the Union Dead" I lament the loss of the old abolitionist spirit; the terrible injustice, in the past and in the present, of the American treatment of the Negro is of the greatest urgency to me as a man and as a writer.

In an ironic twist, The Village Voice would award The Old Glory with five of their Obie Theater Awards (as noted above) a year following their publication of Herschberger's negative article.
