= Merrymount (Quincy, Massachusetts) =

Residential neighborhood in Quincy, Massachusetts, U.S.

Coordinates: 42.2626°N 70.9953°W

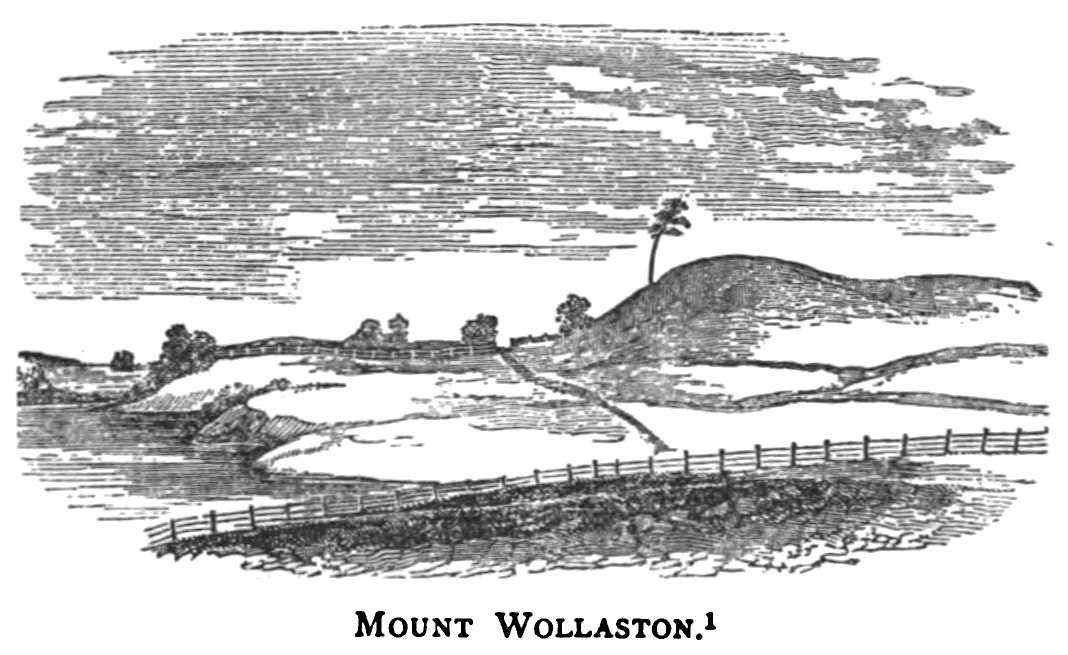
View of Mount Wollaston ("Merrymount") as it appeared in 1840, virtually unchanged from the time of initial English settlement in 1625. The central part of this sketch was adopted as the seal of Quincy.

Merrymount is a primarily residential neighborhood of Quincy, Massachusetts, USA, located between the neighborhoods of Quincy Center and Adams Shore. Although it was the site of Quincy's initial European settlement, Merrymount was not substantially developed for residential use until the first half of the 20th century, and most of the neighborhood's houses date from that period.

== History ==
Merrymount takes its name from the colony of Mare Mount, also known as Merry Mount or Merrymount. Colonist Thomas Morton wrote that the natives called the area "Passonagessit" and that the inhabitants translated this to "ma-re mount". The colony, established in 1625, was officially named Mount Wollaston by the Puritan separatists, but as Morton and other non-Puritans gained influence in the area, the name Merry Mount gained common use. In 1627, Morton and others erected a maypole and conducted a May Day Revel, inviting both colonists and natives. William Bradford indicated that Morton and other English men at Merrymount had been "inviting the Indian [people] (both men and women), for their consorts, dancing and frisking together, (like so many fairies, or furies rather,) and worse practices." This was the inspiration for the Nathaniel Hawthorne short story "The May-Pole of Merry Mount." The Puritan Separatists at Plymouth were scandalized and made concerted efforts to repress Morton and what they considered to be his pagan leanings. Finally, in 1630, with the arrival of Governor Winthrop and 900 more Puritans to what would become Boston, the combined Puritans were able to arrest and deport Morton, and the colony of Mount Wollaston/Merrymount was officially dissolved. In 1637 Morton published a book about his experience at Merrymount where he indicated that English colonists may have had relationships with Indian women who bore children whose eyes "were gray."

The land of the former colony was absorbed by Boston in 1634, then six years later made part of Braintree. The land was eventually sold to an ancestor of Abigail Adams and came to be owned by the Adams family. Prior to this point, the Merrymount area had been home to a substantial Native American population. In 1792, Braintree was divided into several smaller towns, and much of what was once Mount Wollaston was incorporated as the new town of Quincy.

The area that is now Merrymount remained in the Adams' possession until the early 20th century, at which point it was sold off as housing lots. Development consisted mainly of single-family houses and was largely completed by the post-World War II era. A contemporary account from that period describes Merrymount as "the nicest section of Quincy."

== Today ==
Merrymount, as it is currently recognized, is bordered to the north by Quincy Bay, to the west by Black's Creek, to the south by Quincy Center, and to the east by Adams Shore. Landmarks include Mount Wollaston Cemetery, Maypole Hill, Merrymount Elementary School, and the now-defunct Grumpy White's. Recently, the city placed a stone monument to the first settlement in the neighborhood.

== Notable residents ==
- Dick Flavin, "Poet Laureat" of Red Sox Nation
- Joseph Dunford, 36th Commandant of the Marine Corps, 19th Chairman of the Joint Chiefs of Staff
- James McConville, Chief of Staff of the United States Army
