= Beverly Sills =

American operatic soprano (1929–2007)

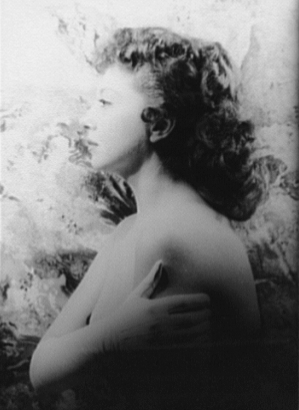
- Sills in 1956

Background information
- Born: 25 May 1929; New York City, U.S.
- Died: 2 July 2007 (aged 78) New York City, U.S.
- Occupation: Opera singer (soprano)
- Years active: 1954–1980

Beverly Sills (born Belle Miriam Silverman; May 25, 1929 – July 2, 2007) was an American soprano whose career peak in opera was between the 1950s and 1970s.

Although she sang a repertoire from Handel and Mozart to Puccini, Massenet and Verdi, she was especially renowned for her performances in coloratura soprano roles in live opera and recordings. Sills was largely associated with the operas of Donizetti, of which she performed and recorded many roles. Her signature roles include the title role in Donizetti's Lucia di Lammermoor, the title role in Massenet's Manon, Marie in Donizetti's La fille du régiment, the three heroines in Offenbach's Les contes d'Hoffmann, Rosina in Rossini's The Barber of Seville, Violetta in Verdi's La traviata, and most notably Elisabetta in Donizetti's Roberto Devereux.

The New York Times noted,

In her prime her technique was exemplary. She could dispatch coloratura roulades and embellishments, capped by radiant high Ds and E-flats, with seemingly effortless agility. She sang with scrupulous musicianship, rhythmic incisiveness and a vivid sense of text.

NPR said her voice was "Capable of spinning a seemingly endless legato line, or bursting with crystalline perfection into waves of dazzling fioriture and thrilling high notes."

After retiring from singing in 1980, she became the general manager of the New York City Opera. In 1994, she became the chairwoman of Lincoln Center and then, in 2002, of the Metropolitan Opera, stepping down in 2005. Sills lent her celebrity to further her charity work for the prevention and treatment of birth defects.

Sills was a member of the executive committee of the Writers and Artists for Peace in the Middle East, a pro-Israel group.

== Biography ==
Sills was born Belle Miriam Silverman in Crown Heights, Brooklyn, New York City, to Shirley Bahn (née Sonia Markovna), a musician, and Morris Silverman, an insurance broker. Her parents were Jewish immigrants from Odessa in the Russian Empire (present-day Ukraine), and Bucharest in Romania. She was raised in Brooklyn, where she was known, among friends, as "Bubbles" Silverman. As a child, she spoke Yiddish, Russian, Romanian, French, and English. She attended Erasmus Hall High School in Brooklyn, as well as Manhattan's Professional Children's School.

At the age of three, Sills won a "Miss Beautiful Baby" contest, in which she sang "The Wedding of Jack and Jill". Beginning at age four, she performed professionally on the Saturday morning radio program, "Rainbow House", as "Bubbles" Silverman. Sills began taking singing lessons with Estelle Liebling at the age of seven and a year later sang in the short film Uncle Sol Solves It (filmed August 1937, released June 1938 by Educational Pictures), by which time she had adopted her stage name, Beverly Sills. Liebling encouraged her to audition for CBS Radio's Major Bowes' Amateur Hour, and on October 26, 1939, at the age of 10, Sills was the winner of that week's program. Bowes then asked her to appear on his Capitol Family Hour, a weekly variety show. Her first appearance was on November 19, 1939, the 17th anniversary of the show, and she appeared frequently on the program thereafter.

In 1945, Sills made her professional stage debut with a Gilbert and Sullivan touring company produced by Jacob J. Shubert, playing twelve cities in the US and Canada, in seven different Gilbert and Sullivan operas. In her 1987 autobiography, she credits that tour with helping to develop the comic timing she soon became famous for: "I played the title role in Patience... a very funny, flaky girl. ... I played her as a dumb Dora all the way through.... I found that I had a gift for slapstick humor, and it was fun to exercise it onstage." Sills sang in operettas for several more years.

On July 9, 1946, Sills appeared as a contestant on the radio show Arthur Godfrey's Talent Scouts. She sang under the pseudonym of "Vicki Lynn", as she was under contract to Shubert. Shubert did not want Godfrey to be able to say he had discovered "Beverly Sills" if she won the contest (although she did not ultimately win). Sills sang "Romany Life" from Victor Herbert's The Fortune Teller.

In 1948-49 Sills toured with Estelle Liebling's "Liebling Singers" ("five girls and a baritone"), performing operatic excerpts in recital with piano.

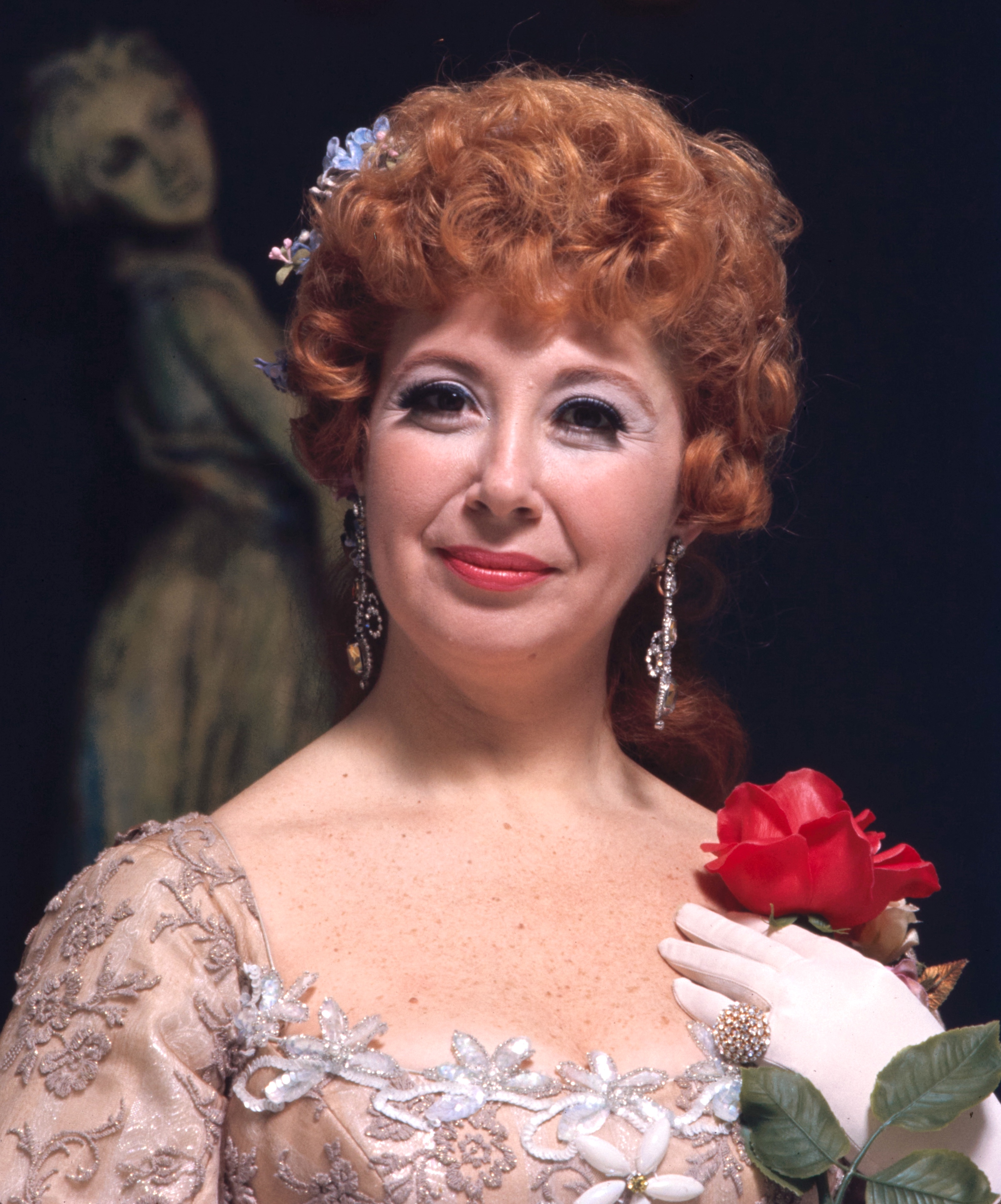
Sills in Manon, 1969

Sills made her operatic stage debut as Frasquita in Bizet's Carmen with the Philadelphia Civic Grand Opera Company on February 14, 1951 (erroneously listed in most references as 1947). She toured North America with the Charles Wagner Opera Company, in the fall of 1951, singing Violetta in La traviata and, in the fall of 1952, singing Micaëla in Carmen. On September 15, 1953, she made her debut with the San Francisco Opera as Helen of Troy in Boito's Mefistofele and also sang Donna Elvira in Don Giovanni the same season. In a step outside of the repertoire she is commonly associated with, Sills gave four performances of the title role of Aida in July 1954 in Salt Lake City. On October 29, 1955, she first appeared with the New York City Opera as Rosalinde in Johann Strauss II's Die Fledermaus, which received critical praise. As early as 1956 she performed before an audience of over 13,000 at the Lewisohn Stadium with the noted operatic conductor Alfredo Antonini in an aria from Bellini's I puritani. Her reputation expanded with her performance of the title role in the New York premiere of Douglas Moore's The Ballad of Baby Doe in 1958.

On November 17, 1956, Sills married journalist Peter Greenough, of the Cleveland, Ohio, newspaper The Plain Dealer and moved to Cleveland. She had two children with Greenough, Meredith ("Muffy") in 1959 and Peter, Jr. ("Bucky"), in 1961. Muffy had profound loss of hearing and developed multiple sclerosis in later years; Peter, Jr. was severely mentally disabled and was epileptic. Sills restricted her performing schedule for six months after each child was born to help care for them.

In 1960, Sills and her family moved to Milton, Massachusetts, near Boston. In 1962, Sills sang the title role in Massenet's Manon with the Opera Company of Boston, the first of many roles for opera director Sarah Caldwell. Manon continued to be one of Sills' signature roles throughout most of her career. In January 1964, she sang her first Queen of the Night in Mozart's The Magic Flute for Caldwell. Although Sills drew critical praise for her coloratura technique and for her performance, she was not fond of the latter role; she observed that she often passed the time between the two arias and the finale addressing holiday cards.

=== Peak singing years ===
In 1966, the New York City Opera revived Handel's then virtually unknown opera seria Giulio Cesare (with Norman Treigle as Caesar), and Sills' performance as Cleopatra made her an international opera star. Sills also made her "unofficial" Met debut at a Lewisohn Stadium summer concert performance as Donna Anna in Don Giovanni, though nothing further came of this other than offers from Rudolf Bing for roles such as Flotow's Martha. In subsequent seasons at the NYCO, Sills had great successes in the roles of the Queen of Shemakha in Rimsky-Korsakov's The Golden Cockerel, the title role in Manon, Donizetti's Lucia di Lammermoor, and the three female leads Suor Angelica, Giorgetta, and Lauretta in Puccini's trilogy Il trittico.

In 1969, Sills sang Zerbinetta in the American premiere (in a concert version) of the 1912 version of Richard Strauss's Ariadne auf Naxos with the Boston Symphony. Her performance of the role, especially Zerbinetta's aria, "Großmächtige Prinzessin", which she sang in the original higher key, won her acclaim. Home video-taped copies circulated among collectors for years afterwards, often commanding large sums on Internet auction sites (the performance was released commercially in 2006, garnering high praise). The second major event of the year was her debut as Pamira in Rossini's The Siege of Corinth at La Scala, a success that put her on the cover of Newsweek.

Sills's now high-profile career landed her on the cover of Time in 1971, where she was described as "America's Queen of Opera". The title was appropriate because Sills had purposely limited her overseas engagements because of her family. Her major overseas appearances include London's Covent Garden, Milan's La Scala, La Fenice in Venice, the Vienna State Opera, the Théâtre de Beaulieu in Lausanne, Switzerland, and concerts in Paris. In South America, she sang in the opera houses of Buenos Aires and Santiago, a concert in Lima, Peru, and appeared in several productions in Mexico City, including Lucia di Lammermoor with Luciano Pavarotti. On November 9, 1971, her performance in the New York City Opera's production of The Golden Cockerel was telecast live to cable TV subscribers.

During this period, she made her first television appearance as a talk-show personality in May 1968 on Virginia Graham's Girl Talk, a weekday series syndicated by ABC Films. An opera fan who was Talent Coordinator for the series persuaded the producer to put her on the air and she was a huge hit. Throughout the rest of her career she shone as a talk show guest, sometimes also functioning as a guest host. Sills underwent successful surgery for ovarian cancer in late October 1974 (sometimes misreported as breast cancer). Her recovery was so rapid and complete that she opened in The Daughter of the Regiment at the San Francisco Opera a month later.

Following Sir Rudolf Bing's departure as director, Sills finally made her debut at the Metropolitan Opera on April 7, 1975 in The Siege of Corinth, receiving an eighteen-minute ovation at her curtain call. Other operas she sang at the Met include La Traviata, Lucia di Lammermoor, Thaïs, and Don Pasquale (directed by John Dexter). In an interview after his retirement, Bing stated that his refusal to use Sills – as well as his preference for engaging, almost exclusively, Italian stars such as Renata Tebaldi due to his notion that American audiences expected to see Italian stars – was the single biggest mistake of his career. Sills attempted to downplay her animosity towards Bing while she was still singing, and even in her two autobiographies. But in a 1997 interview, Sills spoke her mind plainly, "Oh, Mr. Bing is an ass. [W]hile everybody said what a great administrator he was and a great this, Mr. Bing was just an improbable, impossible General Manager of the Metropolitan Opera.... The arrogance of that man."

Sills was a recitalist, especially in the final decade of her career. She sang in mid-size cities and on college concert series, bringing her art to many who might never see her on stage in a fully staged opera. She also sang concerts with a number of symphony orchestras. Sills continued to perform for New York City Opera, her home opera house, essaying new roles right up to her retirement, including the leading roles in Rossini's Il Turco in Italia, Franz Lehár's The Merry Widow and Gian Carlo Menotti's La Loca, an opera commissioned in honor of her 50th birthday. La Loca was the first work written expressly as a vehicle for Sills and was her last new role, as she retired the following year. Her farewell performance was at San Diego Opera in 1980, where she shared the stage with Joan Sutherland in a production of Die Fledermaus.

Although Sills' voice type was characterized as a "lyric coloratura", she took a number of heavier spinto and dramatic coloratura roles more associated with heavier voices as she grew older, including Bellini's Norma, Donizetti's Lucrezia Borgia (with Susanne Marsee as Orsini) and the latter composer's "Three Queens", Anna Bolena, Maria Stuarda and Elisabetta in Roberto Devereux (opposite Plácido Domingo in the title part). She was admired in those roles for transcending the lightness of her voice with dramatic interpretation, although it may have come at a cost: Sills later commented that Roberto Devereux shortened her career by at least four years.

Sills popularized opera through her talk show appearances, including Johnny Carson, Dick Cavett, David Frost, Mike Douglas, Merv Griffin, and Dinah Shore. Sills hosted her own talk show, Lifestyles with Beverly Sills, which ran on Sunday mornings on NBC for two years in the late 1970s; it won an Emmy Award. In 1979 she appeared on The Muppet Show, where she famously went into a "high-note contest" with Miss Piggy. Down-to-earth and approachable, Sills helped dispel the traditional image of the temperamental opera diva.

=== Later years and death ===
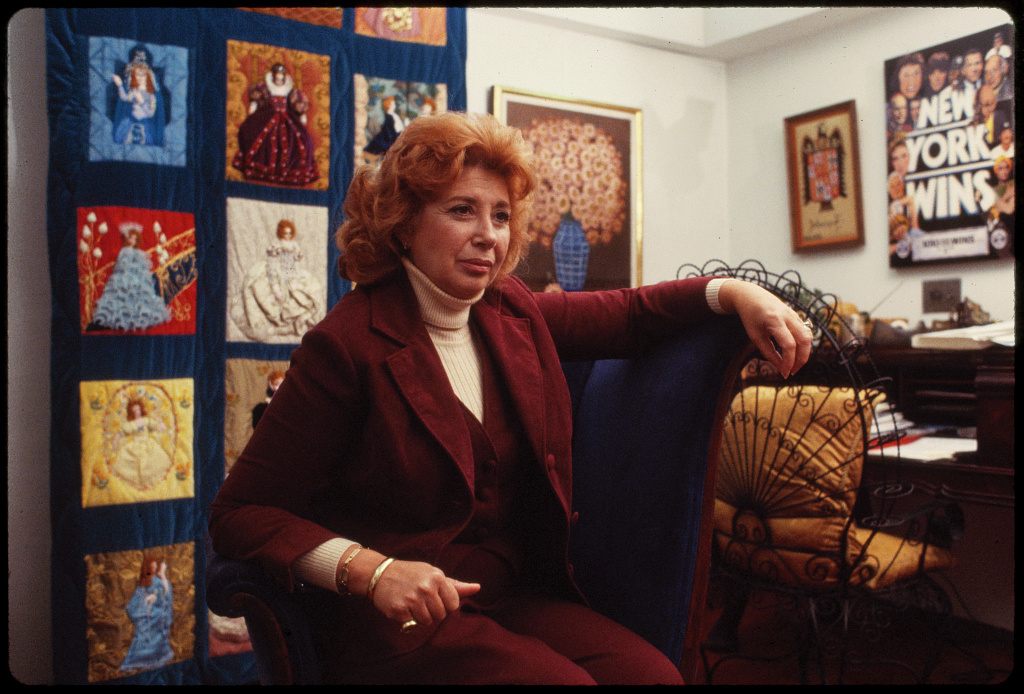
Sills in 1984

In 1978, Sills announced she would retire on October 27, 1980, in a farewell gala at the New York City Opera (NYCO). In the spring of 1979, she began acting as co-director of NYCO, and became its sole general director as of the fall season of that year, a post she held until 1989, although she remained on the NYCO board until 1991. During her time as general director, Sills helped turn what was then a financially struggling opera company into a viable enterprise. She also devoted herself to various arts causes and such charities as March of Dimes and was sought after for speaking engagements on college campuses and for fund raisers.

From 1994 to 2002, Sills was chairwoman of Lincoln Center. In October 2002, she agreed to serve as chairwoman of the Metropolitan Opera, for which she had been a board member since 1991. She resigned as Met chairwoman in January 2005, citing family as the main reason (she had to place her husband, whom she had cared for over eight years, in a nursing home). She stayed long enough to supervise the appointment of Peter Gelb, formerly head of Sony Classical Records, as the Met's general manager, to succeed Joseph Volpe in August 2006.

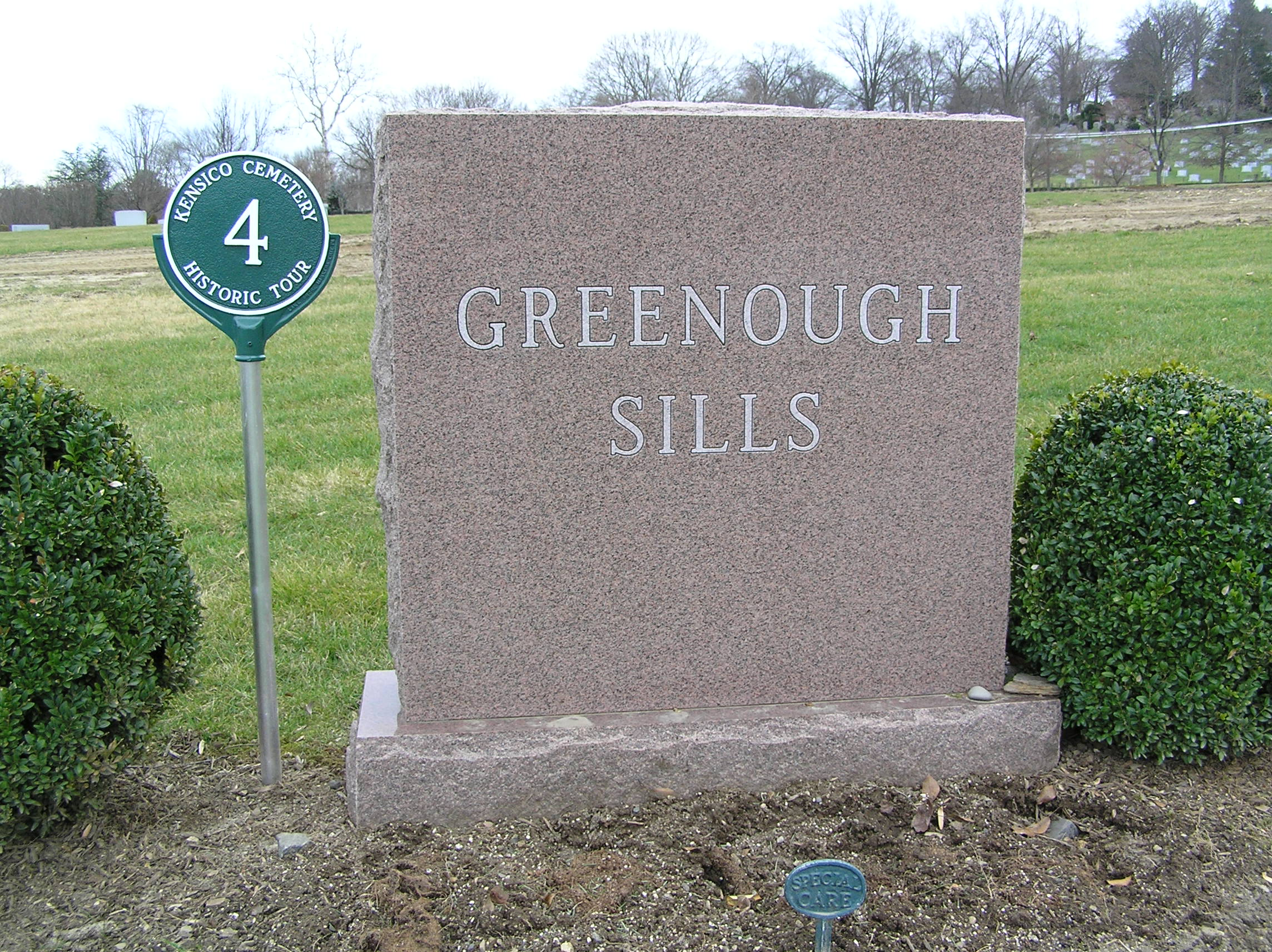
The tombstone of Beverly Sills in Kensico Cemetery

Peter Greenough, Sills's husband, died on September 6, 2006, at the age of 89, shortly before what would have been their 50th wedding anniversary on November 17, 2006.

She co-hosted The View for Best Friends Week on November 9, 2006, as Barbara Walters' best friend. She said she did not sing anymore, even in the shower, to preserve the memory of her voice.

She appeared on screen in movie theaters during HD transmissions live from the Met, interviewed during intermissions by the host Margaret Juntwait on January 6, 2007 (I puritani simulcast), as a backstage interviewer on February 24, 2007 (Eugene Onegin simulcast), and then, briefly, on April 28, 2007 (Il trittico simulcast).

On June 28, 2007, the Associated Press and CNN reported that Sills was hospitalized as "gravely ill", from lung cancer. With her daughter at her bedside, Beverly Sills died of cancer on July 2, 2007, at the age of 78 in her home in Manhattan.

== Voice ==
Sills's voice has been variously described as "rich, supple", "silvery", "precise, a little light", "multicolored", "robust and enveloping", with "a cutting edge that can slice through the largest orchestra and chorus", soaring easily above high C. Her technique and musicianship have been much praised. Conductor Thomas Schippers said in a 1971 interview with Time that she had "the fastest voice alive". The New York Times writes that "she could dispatch coloratura roulade (music) and embellishments, capped with radiant high Ds and E-flats, with seemingly effortless agility. She sang with scrupulous musicianship, rhythmic incisiveness and a vivid sense of text." Soprano Leontyne Price was "flabbergasted at how many millions of things she can do with a written scale." Her vocal range, in performance, extended from F3 to F6, and she said she could sometimes hit a G6 in warm up.

== Operatic repertoire ==
These are the roles that Sills performed on stage or for television or radio.

Composer	Opera	Role	In repertoire	Performed with	Recorded
Bellini	I Capuleti e i Montecchi	Giulietta	1975	Opera Company of Boston	Yes
Bellini	I puritani	Elvira	1972–1978	Philadelphia Lyric Opera Company, New York City Opera, San Francisco Opera, Tulsa Opera	Yes
Bellini	Norma	Norma	1972–1978	Opera Company of Boston, Opera Theatre of New Jersey, Connecticut Opera, Ravinia Festival, San Diego Opera, San Antonio Opera	Yes
Bizet	Carmen	Frasquita	1951	Philadelphia Civic Grand Opera Company	No
Bizet	Carmen	Micaela	1952–1958	Charles Wagner Opera Company, Robin Hood Dell West, Cosmopolitan Opera	No
Bizet	Carmen	Carmen	1956	Musicarnival	No
Bizet	Les pêcheurs de perles	Leila	1956	DuMont Television Network	Yes
Boito	Mefistofele	Helen of Troy	1953	San Francisco Opera	No
Charpentier	Louise	Louise	1962–1977	New York City Opera	Yes
Donizetti	Anna Bolena	Anna	1973–1975	New York City Opera	Yes
Donizetti	Don Pasquale	Norina	1978–1980	Opera Company of Boston, Metropolitan Opera, Houston Grand Opera, San Diego Opera	Yes
Donizetti	La fille du régiment	Marie	1970–1977	Opera Company of Boston, Carnegie Hall, San Antonio Opera, Philadelphia Lyric Opera, San Diego Opera, Cincinnati Opera, Edmonton Opera, Houston Grand Opera, Wolf Trap Opera, San Francisco Opera, New York City Opera, Opera Memphis, Palm Beach Opera	Yes
Donizetti	L'elisir d'amore	Adina	1964	Opera Company of Boston	No
Donizetti	Lucia di Lammermoor	Lucia	1968–1977	Fort Worth Opera, Cincinnati Opera, Edmonton Opera, Opera Company of Boston, New York City Opera, Palacio de Bellas Artes, La Scala, San Antonio Grand Opera, Ravinia Festival, Philadelphia Lyric Opera Company, Covent Garden, Tulsa Opera, Houston Grand Opera, Mississippi Opera Association, Zoo Opera, Wolf Trap Opera, New Orleans Opera, Pittsburgh Opera, Seattle Opera, Teatro Colón, San Francisco Opera, Opera Memphis, San Antonio Symphony, Florentine Opera, Opera Omaha, Metropolitan Opera	Yes
Donizetti	Lucrezia Borgia	Lucrezia Borgia	1975–1976	New York City Opera	Yes
Donizetti	Maria Stuarda	Maria Stuarda	1972–1974	New York City Opera	Yes
Donizetti	Roberto Devereux	Elizabeth I	1970–1975	New York City Opera, Cincinnati Opera, Wolf Trap Opera	Yes
Gounod	Faust	Marguerite	1963–1970	Boston Opera Group, New York City Opera, Cincinnati Opera, Orlando Opera, San Antonio Grand Opera Festival, Duluth Symphony Orchestra	Yes
Handel	Ariodante	Ginevra	1971	Kennedy Center	Yes
Handel	Giulio Cesare	Cleopatra	1966–1971	New York City Opera, Teatro Colón, Cincinnati May Festival	Yes
Handel	Semele	Semele	1967–1969	Cleveland Orchestra, Caramoor Festival	Yes
Hanson	Merry Mount	Lady Marigold Sandys	1964	San Antonio Symphony	No
Hindemith	Hin und zurück	Helene	1965	WGBH-TV	Yes
Kálmán	Countess Maritza	Countess Mariza	1946	Hartman Theatre in Columbus, Ohio	No
Lehár	The Merry Widow	Sonia	1956–1965	Musicarnival, New York City Opera, Casa Mañana, Robin Hood Dell	No
Lehár	The Merry Widow	Hanna Glawari	1977–1979	San Diego Opera, Houston Grand Opera, New York City Opera	Yes
Leoncavallo	Pagliacci	Nedda	1965	Fort Worth Opera	No
Massenet	Manon	Manon	1953–1978	Baltimore Opera Company, New York City Opera, Palacio de Bellas Artes, Teatro Colón, San Francisco Opera, Opera Company of Philadelphia	Yes
Massenet	Thaïs	Thaïs	1954–1978	DuMont Television Network, San Francisco Opera, Metropolitan Opera	Yes
Menotti	La Loca	Juana La Loca	1979	San Diego Opera, New York City Opera	Yes
Meyerbeer	Les Huguenots	Marguerite	1969	Carnegie Hall	Yes
Montemezzi	L'amore dei tre re	Fiora	1956	Philadelphia Grand Opera Company	No
Moore	The Ballad of Baby Doe	Baby Doe	1958–1969	New York City Opera, Musicarnival	Yes
Moore	The Wings of the Dove	Milly Theale	1962	New York City Opera	No
Mozart	Der Schauspieldirektor	Madame Goldentrill	1956	New York City Opera	No
Mozart	Die Entführung aus dem Serail	Konstanze	1965–1975	Boston Opera Group, New York City Opera, Fort Worth Opera, Grant Park, Tanglewood Music Festival, Frederic R. Mann Auditorium, Ravinia Festival	Yes
Mozart	Die Zauberflöte	Queen of the Night	1964–1967	Boston Opera Group, Théâtre de Beaulieu, Tanglewood Music Festival, Houston Grand Opera, Vienna State Opera, New York City Opera, CBC Radio	Yes
Mozart	Don Giovanni	Donna Elvira	1953–1955	San Francisco Opera, Chattanooga Opera Association	No
Mozart	Don Giovanni	Donna Anna	1963–1967	New York City Opera, Opera Company of Boston, Metropolitan Opera, Palacio de Bellas Artes, Théâtre de Beaulieu, Baltimore Opera Company	Yes
Mozart	Le nozze di Figaro	Countess	1965	Miami Opera	No
Nono	Intolleranza 1960	The Companion	1965	Opera Company of Boston	Yes
Offenbach	Les contes d'Hoffmann	Three Heroines	1964–1973	New Orleans Opera, Grant Park, Opera Company of Boston, Cincinnati Opera, New York City Opera, Baltimore Opera Company, Palacio de Bellas Artes, San Antonio Grand Opera, San Antonio Symphony, Shreveport Opera, Municipal Theatre of Santiago, San Diego Opera, Houston Grand Opera, Florida Symphony	Yes
Puccini	La bohème	Musetta	1958–1963	Cosmopolitan Opera, New York City Opera	No
Puccini	La bohème	Mimi	1965	Seattle Opera	No
Puccini	Gianni Schicchi	Lauretta	1967	New York City Opera	Yes
Puccini	Suor Angelica	Suor Angelica	1967	New York City Opera	Yes
Puccini	Il tabarro	Giorgetta	1967	New York City Opera	Yes
Puccini	Tosca	Tosca	1957–1960	Murrah High School Auditorium for the Jackson Opera Guild, Musicarnival	No
Rameau	Hippolyte et Aricie	Aricie	1966	Opera Company of Boston	Yes
Rimsky-Korsakov	Le Coq d'Or	Queen Shemakha	1967–1971	New York City Opera	Yes
Romberg	The Student Prince	Kathie	1954	Chicago Theater of the Air	Yes
Rossini	The Barber of Seville	Rosina	1974–1980	Opera Company of Boston, San Antonio Symphony, New York City Opera, Kennedy Center, Fort Worth Opera, Palm Beach Opera, Festival Internacional Cervantino, Robin Hood Dell	Yes
Rossini	Il turco in Italia	Fiorilla	1978–1979	New York City Opera	Yes
Rossini	The Siege of Corinth	Pamira	1969–1976	La Scala, Metropolitan Opera	Yes
Johann Strauss II	Die Fledermaus	Rosalinda	1955–1980	Musicarnival, New York City Opera, Cincinnati Opera, Opera Company of Boston	Yes
Johann Strauss II	Die Fledermaus	Adele	1977–1980	New York City Opera, San Diego Opera	Yes
Richard Strauss	Ariadne auf Naxos (original version)	Zerbinetta	1969	Boston Symphony Orchestra	Yes
Richard Strauss	Elektra	Fifth Maidservant	1953	San Francisco Opera	No
Sullivan	H.M.S. Pinafore	Josephine	1945	Providence, Rhode Island at the Metropolitan Theater and Hartford, Connecticut at the Bushnell Memorial Auditorium	No
Sullivan	The Pirates of Penzance	Mabel	1945	Hartford, Connecticut at the Bushnell Memorial Auditorium	No
Suppé	Die schöne Galathée	Galatea	1965	Fort Worth Opera	No
Tchaikovsky	Cherevichki (performed under the title The Golden Slipper)	Oxana	1955	New York City Opera	No
Thomas	Mignon	Philine	1956	New York City Opera	No
Verdi	Aida	Aida	1954–1960	University of Utah football stadium, Paterson, New Jersey, Central City Opera	Yes
Verdi	La traviata	Violetta	1951–1977	Kingston High School, Charleston Municipal Auditorium, Orlando Municipal Auditorium, Saenger Theatre, Duke University, Academy of Music, Erie Philharmonic Orchestra, Portland Civic Opera Association, DuMont Television Network, New York City Opera, Fort Worth Opera, Tulsa Opera, Cincinnati Opera, San Antonio Symphony, Grant Park, Teatro di San Carlo, Connecticut Opera, Deutsche Oper Berlin, Los Angeles Philharmonic, Opera Company of Boston, La Fenice, San Antonio Grand Opera, San Francisco Opera, Houston Grand Opera, Ravinia Festival, Palm Beach Opera, Metropolitan Opera, Wolf Trap Opera Company, San Diego Opera	Yes
Verdi	Rigoletto	Gilda	1957–1977	Grant Park, Opera Company of Boston	Yes
Wagner	Die Walküre	Gerhilde	1953	San Francisco Opera	No
Weisgall	Six Characters in Search of an Author	Coloratura	1959–1960	New York City Opera	Yes

== Honors and awards ==
Sills received many honors and awards from the 1970s through her final years. Here is a list of her major awards, divided by category:

- Grammy Award:
  - 1969 – Scenes and Arias from French Opera (nomination)
  - 1970 – Mozart and Strauss Arias (nomination)
  - 1976 – Best Classical Vocal Soloist Performance for Herbert: Music of Victor Herbert (winner)
- Emmy Award nominations:
  - 1975 – Profile in Music: Beverly Sills, Festival '75 (winner)
  - 1977 – Sills and Burnett at the Met
  - 1978 – Lifestyles with Beverly Sills (winner)
  - 1980 – Beverly Sills in Concert
  - 1981 – Great Performances: Beverly! (her farewell performance)
- Honorary doctorates in music:
  - 1972 – Temple University
  - 1973 – New York University and New England Conservatory of Music
  - 1974 – Harvard University
  - 1975 – California Institute of the Arts
- Other music-related awards:
  - 1970 – Musical America – Musician of the Year
  - 1971 – Inducted as a National Patroness of Delta Omicron, an international professional music fraternity on May 1
  - 1972 – Edison Award – Manon recording
  - 1973 – Handel Medallion from New York City for artistic achievement
  - 1979 – Recording Industry of America Cultural Award
  - 1980 – Golden Baton, American Symphony Orchestra League
  - 1985 – Kennedy Center Honors
  - 1990 – National Medal of Arts from National Endowment for the Arts
  - 1996 – The 2nd Annual Heinz Award in Arts and Humanities
  - 2005 – Beverly Sills Artist Award established by the Metropolitan Opera ($50,000 annual award)
  - 2007 – Inducted into the Long Island Music Hall of Fame
- Charitable and humanitarian awards:
  - 1979 – Pearl S. Buck Women's Award
  - 1980 – Presidential Medal of Freedom
  - 1981 – Barnard College Medal of Distinction
  - 1984 – Charles S. Hughes Gold Medal Award – National Conference of Christians and Jews
  - 1985 – Gold Medal from National Institute of Social Sciences
  - 1989 – Golden Plate Award of the American Academy of Achievement
  - 1998 – National Women's Hall of Fame

Sills was a member of the Delta Sigma Theta sorority.

== Recordings and broadcasts ==
During her operatic career, Sills recorded eighteen full-length operas:

Year	Album details	Contributing artists	Label
1959	Moore: The Ballad of Baby Doe	Walter Cassel, Frances Bible, New York City Opera Orchestra and Chorus, Emerson Buckley	MGM (reissued on Deutsche Grammophon in 1999)
1967	Handel: Giulio Cesare	Norman Treigle, Maureen Forrester, Beverly Wolff, Spiro Malas, Dominic Cossa, Michael Devlin, William Beck, New York City Opera Chorus and Orchestra, Julius Rudel	RCA Victor Red Seal
1969	Donizetti: Roberto Devereux	Róbert Ilosfalvy, Peter Glossop, Beverly Wolff, Kenneth MacDonald, Don Garrard, Gwynne Howell, Richard Van Allan, Ambrosian Opera Chorus, Royal Philharmonic Orchestra, Sir Charles Mackerras	ABC Records (remastered and reissued on both EMI and Deutsche Grammophon)
1970	Donizetti: Lucia di Lammermoor	Piero Cappuccilli, Carlo Bergonzi, Adolf Dallapozza, Justino Díaz, Patricia Kern, Keith Erwen, Ambrosian Opera Chorus, London Symphony Orchestra, Thomas Schippers	EMI (remastered and reissued on both Westminster and Deutsche Grammophon)
1970	Massenet: Manon	Nicolai Gedda, Gérard Souzay, Gabriel Bacquier, Nico Castel, Michel Trempont, Patricia Kern, Michèle Raynaud, Hélia T'Hézan, Ambrosian Opera Chorus, New Philharmonia Orchestra, Julius Rudel	ABC Records (remastered and reissued on both EMI and Deutsche Grammophon)
1971	Verdi: La traviata	Nicolai Gedda, Rolando Panerai, Delia Wallis, Mirella Fiorentini, Keith Erwen, Terence Sharpe, Richard Van Allan, Robert Lloyd, Mario Carlin, William Elvin, John Alldis Choir, Royal Philharmonic Orchestra, Aldo Ceccato	EMI
1971	Donizetti: Maria Stuarda	Eileen Farrell, Stuart Burrows, Louis Quilico, Christian du Plessis, Patricia Kern, John Alldis Choir, London Philharmonic Orchestra, Aldo Ceccato	ABC Records (remastered and reissued on both EMI and Deutsche Grammophon)
1972	Offenbach: Les contes d'Hoffmann	Stuart Burrows, Norman Treigle, Susanne Marsee, Nico Castel, Robert Lloyd, Patricia Kern, Raimund Herincx, Bernard Dickerson, John Noble, John Alldis Choir, London Symphony Orchestra, Julius Rudel	ABC Records (remastered and reissued on both EMI and Deutsche Grammophon)
1972	Donizetti: Anna Bolena	Shirley Verrett, Stuart Burrows, Paul Plishka, Patricia Kern, Robert Lloyd, Robert Tear, John Alldis Choir, London Symphony Orchestra, Julius Rudel	ABC Records (remastered and reissued on both EMI and Deutsche Grammophon)
1973	Bellini: I puritani	Richard Van Allan, Paul Plishka, Nicolai Gedda, Louis Quilico, Riccardo Cassinelli, Heather Begg, Ambrosian Opera Chorus, London Symphony Orchestra, Julius Rudel	ABC Records (remastered and reissued on both EMI and Deutsche Grammophon)
1973	Bellini: Norma	Shirley Verrett, Enrico di Giuseppe, Paul Plishka, Delia Wallis, Robert Tear, John Alldis Choir, New Philharmonia Orchestra, James Levine	ABC Records (remastered and reissued on both EMI and Deutsche Grammophon)
1974	Rossini: Le siège de Corinthe	Shirley Verrett, Justino Díaz, Harry Theyard, Gwynne Howell, Robert Lloyd, Delia Wallis, Gaetano Scano, Ambrosian Opera Chorus, London Symphony Orchestra, Thomas Schippers	EMI (sung in Italian)
1975	Rossini: Il barbiere di Siviglia	Nicolai Gedda, Sherrill Milnes, Renato Capecchi, Ruggero Raimondi, Fedora Barbieri, Joseph Galiano, Michael Rippon, John Alldis Choir, London Symphony Orchestra, James Levine	EMI
1975	Bellini: I Capuleti e i Montecchi	Janet Baker, Robert Lloyd, Nicolai Gedda, Raimund Herincx, John Alldis Choir, New Philharmonia Orchestra, Giuseppe Patanè	EMI
1976	Massenet: Thaïs	Sherrill Milnes, Nicolai Gedda, Richard Van Allan, Ann-Marie Connors, Ann Murray, Norma Burrowes, Patricia Kern, Brian Ethridge, John Alldis Choir, New Philharmonia Orchestra, Lorin Maazel	EMI
1977	Charpentier: Louise	Nicolai Gedda, Mignon Dunn, José van Dam, Chœrs et Orchestre du Théâtre National de l'Opéra de Paris, Julius Rudel	EMI
1978	Donizetti: Don Pasquale	Donald Gramm, Alan Titus, Alfredo Kraus, Henry Newman, Ambrosian Opera Chorus, London Symphony Orchestra, Sarah Caldwell	EMI
1978	Verdi: Rigoletto	Alfredo Kraus, Sherrill Milnes, Samuel Ramey, Mignon Dunn, Ann Murray, John Rawnsley, Dennis O'Neill, Malcolm King, Sally Burgess, Ambrosian Opera Chorus, Philharmonia Orchestra, Julius Rudel	EMI

Sills also recorded nine solo recital albums of arias and songs, and was soprano soloist on a 1967 recording of Mahler's Symphony No. 2.

She starred in eight opera productions televised on PBS and several more on other public TV systems. She participated in such TV specials as A Look-in at the Met with Danny Kaye in 1975, Sills and Burnett at the Met, with Carol Burnett in 1976, and Profile in Music, which won an Emmy Award for its showing in the US in 1975, although it had been recorded in England in 1971. She also played the role of Helene in a complete performance of Hin und Zurück on Episode 6 of Aaron Copland's WNET series Music in the Twenties.

Some of those televised performances have been commercially distributed on videotape and DVD:

- Ariadne auf Naxos (Watson, Nagy; Leinsdorf, 1969) [Concert Version]
- La fille du régiment (Costa-Greenspon, McDonald, Malas; Wendelken-Wilson, Mansouri, 1974)
- Roberto Devereux (Marsee, Alexander, Fredricks; Rudel, Capobianco, 1975)
- La traviata (H.Price, Fredricks; Rudel, Capobianco, 1976)
- Il barbiere di Siviglia (H.Price, Titus, Gramm, Ramey; Caldwell, Caldwell, 1976)
- Manon (H.Price, Fredricks, Ramey; Rudel, Capobianco, 1977)

Others not available commercially include:

- The Magic Flute (Pracht, Shirley, Reardon; NN, NN, 1966)
- Le coq d'or (Costa-Greenspon, di Giuseppe, Treigle; Rudel, Capobianco, 1971)
- Die lustige Witwe (Titus; Alcántara, Capobianco, 1977)
- Il turco in Italia (Marsee, H.Price, Titus, Gramm; Rudel, Capobianco, 1978)
- Don Pasquale (Kraus, Hagegård, Bacquier; Rescigno, Dexter, 1979)

After her retirement from singing in 1980 up through 2006, Sills was the host for many of the PBS Live from Lincoln Center telecasts.

== Further reading/listening/viewing ==
- Sills, Beverly (1976). Bubbles: A Self-Portrait. New York: Bobbs-Merrill. ISBN 0-446-81520-9. A revised edition was issued in 1981 as Bubbles: An Encore.
- Sills, Beverly (with Lawrence Linderman) (1987). Beverly: An Autobiography. New York: Bantam Books. ISBN 0-553-05173-3.
- Sills, Beverly (1987). Beverly Sills: On My Own. ISBN 0-553-45743-8. An audio book designated as a companion to Beverly: An Autobiography, with Sills speaking in interview about her life, interspersed with narration and live musical excerpts. There is no direct text from the printed autobiography.
- Paolucci, Bridget (1990). Beverly Sills. New York: Chelsea House Publishers. ISBN 1-55546-677-X. A biography for young adults.
- Sargeant, Withrop (1973). Divas. New York: Coward, McCann & Geoghegan. ISBN 0-698-10489-7.
- Beverly Sills: Made in America (2006). Deutsche Grammophon B0007999-09. A 90-minute documentary on Sills's singing career with many rare video performance and interview clips.
- Guy, Nancy (2015). "The Magic of Beverly Sills". Urbana, Chicago: University of Illinois Press. ISBN 978-0-252-03973-7.
- Waleson, Heidi (2018). Mad Scenes and Exit Arias. New York: Henry Holt and Company. ISBN 978-1-62779-497-8. A history of New York City Opera, Sills' home company, covering her singing career and directorship there.
