= Merrymount Colony =

Colony in New England (1624–1630)

- 1624–1630
- Status: Colony of England
- Historical era: British colonization of the Americas
  - Established as Mount Wollaston: 1624
  - Renamed Merrymount: 1626
  - Destroyed by John Endicott: 1630

Population
  - Estimate: 8 (1628)
Preceded by	Succeeded by
Massachusett	Massachusetts Bay Colony

The Merrymount Colony, originally Mount Wollaston, was a short-lived English colony in New England founded by Richard Wollaston on the present site of Quincy, Massachusetts. After Wollaston died on a trip to Virginia, Thomas Morton led a rebellion, taking over the colony with the promise to share the profits equally. It was founded in 1624 and lasted six years until its destruction by the Puritans of the neighboring Plymouth Colony and Massachusetts Bay Colony.

== History ==
Ferdinando Gorges had long been a promoter of English colonization of the Americas, and sought to use the success of the Plymouth Colony for his own ambitions on New England. Gorges sent a group of adventurers and indentured servants, led by Richard Wollaston and Humphrey Rastall on the ship Unity, which set sail from London on March 23, 1624. Among the passengers on the Unity was Thomas Morton, a lawyer, who, when the ship arrived in New England in June of 1624, was highly impressed by the abundant resources of the land, later writing "if this land be not rich, then is the whole world poore.” Despite Morton's statements on the colony's abundance, it soon struggled with famine.

=== Morton takes control ===
Wollaston quickly viewed the colony as a failure, traveling to Virginia with several of the indentured servants and writing to Rasdall, telling him to join him there and bring more indentured servants to sell for a profit. Rasdall obliged, sailing to Virginia and leaving a man named Fitcher in charge until his return. Morton then held a feast with the remaining servants, telling them they would be sold in Virginia upon Wollaston's return. Morton convinced the servants to overthrow Fitcher, telling them they would be freed of their servitude and would live together as equals.

=== Under Morton ===
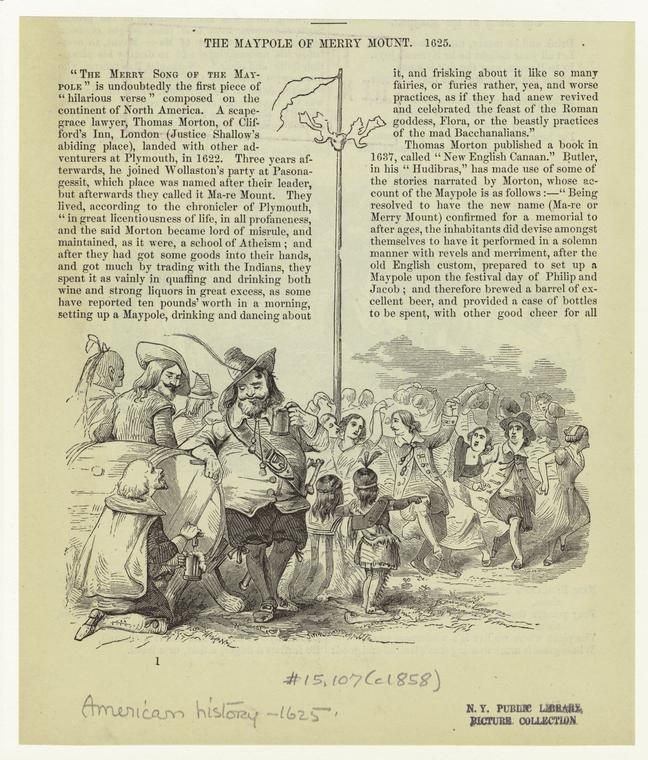
Illustration of Merrymount Colony

Morton kept his promise, abolishing all formal hierarchy in the colony. In his writings, Morton refers to himself as "Mine Host," seeing himself as merely one among equals. Morton renamed the settlement Ma-Re Mount, from the Latin word mare and a supposed translation of the Indian name Passonagessit meaning "hill by the sea." William Bradford's account of the colony in Of Plymouth Plantation conflicts with this, calling the colony "Merie-mounte" from the English word merry. Whatever the etymology, Morton sought to commemorate the new name by erecting a maypole and holding a celebration on May Day, 1627. The maypole was made of pine and stood 80 feet high, covered in garlands and ribbons with a buck's antlers nailed to the top. The maypole was brought to the top of the hill and raised to the sounds of drums and gunfire. Morton then affixed a poem to the pole, the oldest known American poem.

Bradford asserts that the people of Merrymount danced around the maypole for several days at a time, inviting the Indian women to dance with them. The line about "lasses in beaver coats" seems to corroborate the story of dancing with Indian women. Bradford also claims to have heard reports of the people of Merrymount drinking up to 10 pounds of alcohol in a morning.

=== Conflict with Plymouth ===
Morton's revelry quickly drew the ire of the staunchly religious Pilgrims twenty miles to the south. Their governor, William Bradford, called Morton a "lord of misrule" who had established a "schoole of Athisme." The term "lord of misrule" was borrowed from Philip Stubbs 1587 pamphlet Anatomie of Abuses. Bradford further compares Merrymount's party with the feast of Flora and the Bacchanalians. He also labeled the maypole an idol, comparing it to the Calf of Horeb. Maypoles were a longstanding tradition in England, but were anathema to the Puritan religion, who saw the tradition as an excuse for debauchery. Bradford further charged that Morton had sold firearms to the Indians in violation of an often ignored royal proclamation.

Morton claimed that the Separatist Pilgrims were opposed his use of the Book of Common Prayer and were jealous of Merrymount's success in the fur trade, an important source of revenue for Plymouth. Morton's account also conflicts with Bradford's notion of constant reveling, claiming there was only a party on May Day.

=== Morton's arrest ===
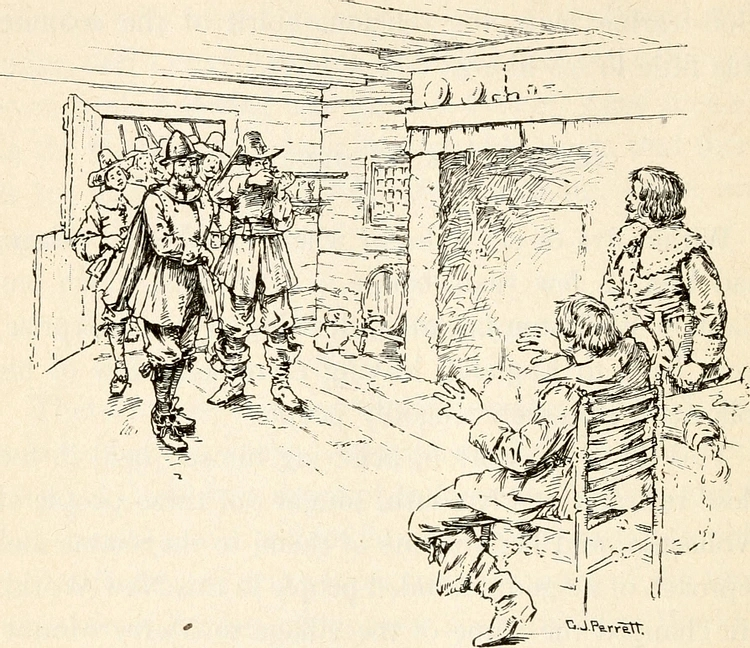
Thomas Morton arrested by Myles Standish

Word of Morton's supposed arms trading with the Indians soon reached English settlers in Pascataway, Nantasket, Naumkeake, Winisimett and Wessagussett, who sent messages to Plymouth, urging them to do something about Morton. Plymouth first sent Morton a letter, urging him to cease gun sales to the Indians. Morton, a lawyer, responded that selling guns to the Indians was not a crime, as the royal proclamation bore no prescribed punishment. Even if it was, he argued, the proclamation was void with the death of James I. Morton also promised that the settlers at Merrymount would defend themselves if Plymouth came after them.

Despite Morton's threat, in 1628 Bradford dispatched a small force led by Myles Standish to Merrymount. Standish found that Morton and his six associates had barricaded their doors and all were armed. Fortunately for Standish, Bradford writes, "if they had not been over armed with drinke, more hurt might have been done." Standish and his men convinced Morton to leave the fortified building. None were harmed except "one that was so drunk that he ran his own nose upon the point of a sword that one held before him, as he entered the house; but he lost but a little of his hot blood." Morton was arrested and brought to Plymouth until he could be picked up by an English ship and returned to England.

=== Destruction of Merrymount ===
Just three months after Morton's arrest, another group of settlers had arrived from England and established the Massachusetts Bay Colony, which included Merrymount within its limit. Among these settlers was John Endecott who, with a small band, went to Merrymount, chopped down the maypole and dispersed Morton's followers. Endecott also renamed Merrymount to Mount Dagon. Morton returned to America in the fall of 1629 and found himself in trouble again after refusing to sign a proviso at a meeting of the general court. At the next meeting of the general court it was ordered that Morton be arrested. Just two weeks later Morton was arraigned and sentenced to be placed in stocks and returned to England on the ship Gifte. Morton was also made to watch as his home in Merrymount was burned down in front of him.

=== Aftermath ===
Finally expelled from America, Morton prepared a lawsuit against Massachusetts Bay, hoping to get the colonies' charters revoked and their governments replaced by one headed by his employer, Ferdinando Gorges. The briefs from the lawsuit would become The New English Canaan, a book describing New England and providing Morton's accounts of the events. In 1633, Morton attempted to have the book published in England, but was prevented from doing so. Four years later, Morton succeeded in having the book published in Amsterdam. The book has been termed the first banned book in America.

== Legacy ==
The events of the colony were depicted in Nathaniel Hawthorne's 1836 short story "The May-Pole of Merry Mount." Howard Hanson's 1933 opera Merry Mount was based on Hawthorne's story.
