= Adams Shore =

Coordinates: 42.264°N 70.984°W

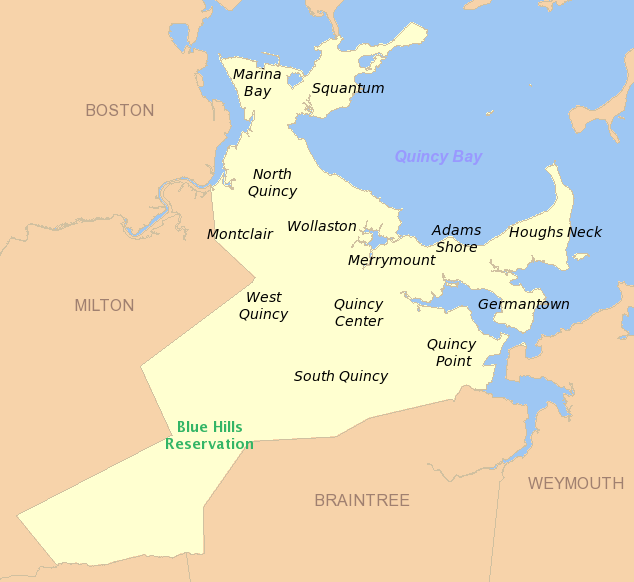
Map of Quincy neighborhoods

Adams Shore is a neighborhood of Quincy, Massachusetts. It is located on the shore of Quincy Bay at the entrance to the Hough's Neck peninsula. It is bordered on the north by Quincy Bay, on the east by the Hough's Neck neighborhood, on the south by Town River Bay and on the west by the Merrymount neighborhood. According to the U.S. Census Bureau, in 2000 the population of Adams Shore was just over 1,500.

== History ==
Adams Shore was started as a real estate development for resort homes in the 1890s. It is situated on land formerly belonging to the Adams family, which included two former presidents of the United States, John Adams and John Quincy Adams. The neighborhood evolved into a traditional neighborhood of family homes.

== Transportation ==
Sea Street is the major thoroughfare in the neighborhood. Adams Shore is served by bus routes 214 and 216 of the Massachusetts Bay Transportation Authority with service to Quincy Center.
