= Lawrence Linderman =

Lawrence Linderman is a writer who has written extensively for Playboy and Penthouse magazines. He also helped Beverly Sills pen her autobiography.

His article "Undercover Angel" in the July, 1981 issue of Playboy was the basis for Larry Ferguson's screenplay for the movie Beyond the Law.
