= Hin und zurück =

Operatic sketch by Paul Hindemith

- Operatic sketch by Paul Hindemith
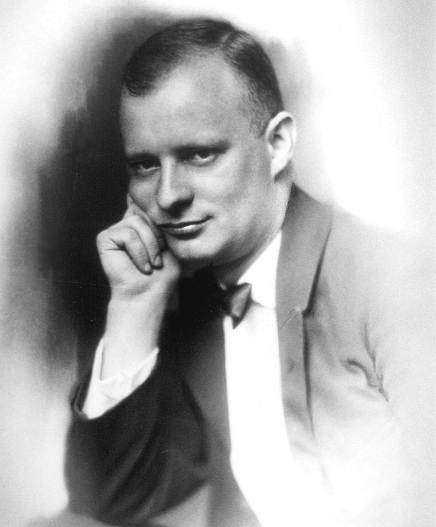
- The composer in 1923
- Librettist: Marcellus Schiffer
- Language: German
- Premiere: 17 July 1927; Baden-Baden Music Festival

Hin und zurück (Back and forth) is an operatic 'sketch' (Op. 45a) in one scene by Paul Hindemith, with a German libretto by Marcellus Schiffer. It acts as a parody of conventional opera tropes featuring a coloratura ariette, a jealousy duet, and a terzet for the tenor, baritone and bass.

Hindemith wrote the piece for a collection of miniature operas presented on 17 July 1927 at the Baden-Baden Music Festival in the Theater Baden-Baden. The work lasts for just 12 minutes. Other short works by Darius Milhaud (L'enlèvement d'Europe), Kurt Weill (Mahagonny-Songspiel) and Ernst Toch (Die Prinzessin auf der Erbse) were performed the same evening. The performance was re-enacted in October 2013 by the Gotham Chamber Opera in New York City. On 9 August 1940 the piece would be performed at the Tanglewood summer music academy with Hindemith himself playing one of the piano parts. He then directed three stage performances of the work at the Hartt School of Music in Hartford, Connecticut on 12, 13 and 14 May 1942.

== Instrumentation ==
Flute

Clarinet

Alto Saxophone

Bassoon

Trumpet

Trombone

1 Four Handed Piano

1 Two Handed Piano

Harmonium (Behind the Stage)

== Roles ==
Role	Voice type	Premiere cast, 17 July 1927 (Conductor: Ernst Mehlich)
Robert	tenor	J. Klemperer
Helene	soprano	Betty Mergler
Professor	baritone	Gerhard Pechner
Ambulance man	bass	Lothar
Wise man	tenor	Giebel
Aunt	Silent	
Serving Girl	Spoken	

== Synopsis ==
In a kind of dramatic palindrome, a tragedy unfolds involving jealousy, murder and suicide, which is then replayed with the lines sung in reverse order to produce a happy ending.

Robert (tenor), returns home unexpectedly, and finds that his wife Helene (soprano) has received a letter from an unnamed lover. He flies into a jealous rage and shoots her. After her dead body is carried off by the Professor (baritone) and the Ambulance Man (bass), Robert throws himself out of his window. A wise man enters the stage, and deplores the tragedy. He then causes time to run backwards, causing the music and the text to also run backwards, ending the opera happily before Helene was killed.

== Musical style and structure ==
The opera is notable for its structure, which has the music of the opera run backwards halfway through the opera. The piece uses the idea of retrograde overall throughout the piece but does not use it in individual phrases of text or music. For example the first line of text in the opera "Guten Morgen, liebe Tante," does not get reversed as "Tante Liebe, Morgen Guten," but remains the same. Rather it is the order of phrases that is reversed so that "Guten Morgen, liebe Tante" is both the first and last lines of the opera. This also keeps the internal syntax of sentences. With regards to musical phrases, musicologist Alexandra Monchick notes that:

"A literal palindrome of the music would have ramifications for the quasi-tonal. A few years later Alban Berg produced an exact palindrome for the movie sequence in his opera Lulu (1929-1934). Since Lulu was a twelve tone opera, not dependent on tonal hierarchies, Berg was able to replicate an exact palindrome at the pitch class level, without a breakdown of logical musical language. However this was not possible for Hindemith in this instance. As in most of his works, Hindemith's musical language in Hin and Zurück is tonally centered without being diatonic. The piece is based around A, the key in which the overture begins... The musical numbers also form a palindrome. Hindemith divides the opera into baroque-like short numbers: Prelude, Ariette, Duett, Terzett and their recapitulations after the Sages Monologue."

The tonal scheme of the opera is:

A	E	A-flat	E	G-Sharp
Prelude	Terzett I	Sage's Monologue	Terzett II	Prelude II

During the first Terzett, the harmony gradually moves by minor thirds from the key of E to the distant key of A-flat for the sages monologue. During the recapitulations, the music returns to E for the second Terzett, but instead of returning to the key of A for the second Prelude, the music instead goes to the key of G sharp, which is the leading tone to A. "Instead of forming a satisfying dramatic circle back to the tonic, the resolution is more of a dramatic spiral. This perhaps signifies that people's actions can never be completely undone...Also, the ending in the G-sharp key area is an enharmonic equivalent of A-flat, the key of the Sage's Monologue, evoking once again the cause of this reversed ending."

== Recordings ==
Year	Cast: Robert Helene Professor Ambulance Man Wise Man	Conductor Orchestra	Label
1964	Niels Brincker Else Margrethe Gardelli Gert Bastian Mogens Wedel Poul Wiedemann	Jørn Mathiassen	Not Listed

There is also a complete performance of Hin und zurück (in English), with Beverly Sills as Helene, conducted by Sarah Caldwell, on Episode 6 of Aaron Copland's WNET series Music in the Twenties.
