= Richard Wollaston =

English sea captain and pirate

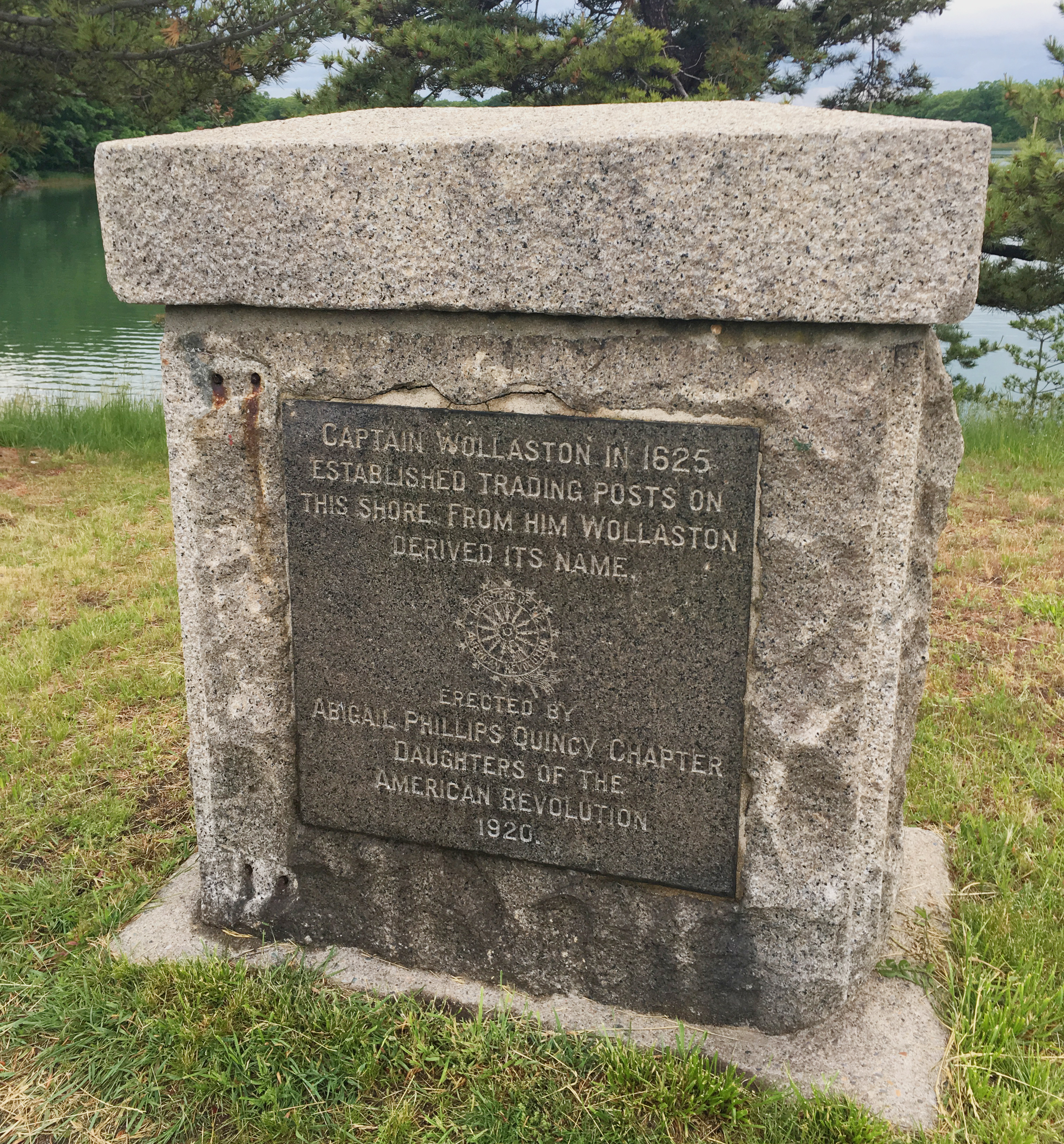
Captain Wollaston marker

Richard Wollaston (died March 17, 1626) was an English sea captain and pirate who was one of the first colonists in New England and the namesake of Mount Wollaston (Merrymount Colony) and Wollaston (Quincy, Massachusetts). Some historians believe that Wollaston was first mentioned in 1615 by Capt. John Smith who recorded a confrontation with an English pirate, Captain Barra and his lieutenant "Capt. Wollistone." In 1617 Sir Walter Raleigh mentioned an encounter Captain Wollaston during his second trip to Guiana. In 1624-25 Captain Wollaston brought a group of approximately thirty indentured servants led by Thomas Morton to Massachusetts, where they founded Merrymount. Wollaston also was known for transporting workers to Cape Ann, Monhegan Island, and Virginia. On March 18, 1626, Captain John Bennington reported to the Duke of Buckingham that Captain Wollaston had been buried the day before.
