= Beyond the Law (1993 film) =

1993 film by Larry Ferguson

- Film poster
- Directed by: Larry Ferguson
- Written by: Larry Ferguson
- Produced by: John Fiedler; Mark Tarlov
- Starring: Charlie Sheen; Linda Fiorentino; Michael Madsen; Courtney B. Vance; Leon Rippy; Rip Torn
- Cinematography: Robert M. Stevens
- Edited by: Don Brochu; Robert C. Jones
- Music by: John D'Andrea; Cory Lerios
- Production companies: Capitol Films; Polar Entertainment Corporation
- Release date: April 22, 1993 (Germany)
- Running time: 108 minutes
- Country: United States
- Language: English
- Budget: $18,000,000 (estimated)

Beyond the Law (also known as Fixing the Shadow and as Made of Steel in its Director's Cut) is a 1993 American crime drama film written and directed by Larry Ferguson (in his directing debut). It tells the story of Dan Saxon, an undercover cop who infiltrates a group of criminal outlaw bikers behind a drug-smuggling and arms-dealing operation. In order to maintain their trust, he must commit ever more dangerous and heinous crimes and must question how far he can go beyond the law. The film stars Charlie Sheen, Linda Fiorentino, and Michael Madsen.

== Plot ==
Based on a true story, the film centers on Dan Saxon, a cop with a troubled childhood. After getting fired following a physical confrontation with his corrupt boss (who secretly works with a biker gang known as the Jackals, led by their president "Blood") at the sheriff's office, he is enlisted by Conroy Price, an agent in Arizona's State Attorney General's office, to go undercover to bust the illegal drugs and arms trafficking. Saxon is unsuccessful until he meets and befriends Virgil, a mechanic who introduces him to the seedy world of criminal bikers.

Virgil tutors Saxon on bikes and customs of the "outlaw motorcycle brotherhood." After many lessons and a major change in appearance Saxon develops an alter ego named "Sid" and ends up infiltrating the Jackals and earning the trust of "Blood". At the same time, he begins a relationship with a photojournalist, Renee Jason, who is aware of his dual life.

As Saxon falls deeper into this world of crime, he becomes more unbalanced. After a violent situation that led to the murder of a 20-year-old convenience store attendant, Saxon is brought back to earth. Saxon's Identity is revealed, by Price, to the local, state, and federal law enforcement, much to their praise for Saxon's undercover skills. Concluding the undercover operation, over 200 arrests are made including Blood. The end of the film shows Saxon walking into the desert. It is revealed in the narrated epilogue that Saxon and Renee are living in California, and "Blood" is serving 3 consecutive life sentences.

== Cast ==
- Charlie Sheen as William Patrick Steiner / Agent Dan Saxon / "Sid"
- Linda Fiorentino as Renee Jason
- Michael Madsen as "Blood"
- Courtney B. Vance as U.S. Assistant Attorney Conroy Price
- Leon Rippy as Virgil
- Rino Thunder as Charlie "Bogus Charlie"
- Rip Torn as Deputy Butch Prescott
- Steven Chambers as ATF Agent Clyde, Undercover ATF Agent on Motorcycle
- Lyndsay Riddell as Marybette Jason, Renee's Daughter
- Dennis Burkley as "Oatmeal"
- Ed Adams as "Dirt"
- James Oscar Lee as "Highside"
- Hollie Chamberlain as "Stephie"
- Brenda Phillips as "Bubbles"
- Richard Madsen as "Buster"
- Ted Parks as "Sidewinder"
- Larry Ferguson as Sheriff Bob Kelly, a corrupt cop on Blood's payroll

== Background ==
Larry Ferguson wrote the screenplay after reading the article "Undercover Angel" by Lawrence Linderman in the July, 1981 issue of Playboy on an undercover agent named Dan Black. Black served as a technical advisor on the film and appeared as an extra in the movie.
