= Larry Ferguson (screenwriter) =

American screenwriter and film director

- Education: University of Oregon; University of California, Davis
- Occupations: Screenwriter, film director, actor
- Years active: 1980–2002

Larry Ferguson is an American retired screenwriter and film director.

== Career ==
As a screenwriter, his film credits include Highlander, Beverly Hills Cop II, The Hunt for Red October and Alien 3.

== Filmography ==
=== Film ===
| Year | Title | Writer | Producer | Director |
|---|---|---|---|---|
| 1981 | St. Helens | Yes | No | No |
| 1986 | Highlander | Yes | No | No |
| 1987 | Beverly Hills Cop II | Yes | No | No |
| 1988 | The Presidio | Yes | No | No |
| 1990 | The Hunt for Red October | Yes | No | No |
| 1991 | Talent for the Game | Yes | No | No |
| 1992 | Alien 3 | Yes | No | No |
| 1992 | Nails | Yes | No | No |
| 1993 | Beyond the Law | Yes | No | Yes |
| 1995 | Gunfighter's Moon | Yes | Executive | Yes |
| 1996 | Maximum Risk | Yes | No | No |
| 2002 | Rollerball | Yes | No | No |

Uncredited revisions

- Under Siege (1992)
- Last Action Hero (1993)
- Judgment Night (1993)
- Bad Boys (1995)
- Money Train (1995)
- Bad Boys II (2003)
- Master and Commander: The Far Side of the World (2003)
- Man of the House (2005)

Unmade screenplays

| Title | Description | Ref. |
|---|---|---|
| Buck Rogers | A film based on the comic strip series by Philip Francis Nowlan | |
| Have Gun Will Travel | A western based on the television show of the same name that would’ve been directed by Andrew Davis. | |
| The Listener | Based on a script by James DeMonaco and Kevin Fox | |
| Quiller | A film adaptation based on the book series by Elleston Trevor | |
| Tears of the Sun | A Thriller for 20th Century Fox that was co-written with Ronald Bass, Joel Gross, Alan McElroy, Chris Gerolmo, and Robert Mark Kamen. | |
| Witness to the Truth | Based on a novel by Paul Lindsay | |

==== Acting credits ====
| Year | Film | Role | Notes |
|---|---|---|---|
| 1990 | The Hunt for Red October | Chief of Boat USS Dallas | |
| 1992 | Beyond the Law | Sheriff Kelly | also director |
| 1993 | Last Action Hero | Himself | |
