= Peter Greenough =

American journalist and editor

Peter B. Greenough (February 6, 1917 – September 6, 2006) was an American journalist and editor. He was the husband of opera singer Beverly Sills.

Greenough was born in Brookline, Massachusetts, and graduated from Harvard University and the Columbia School of Journalism. In 1940, he was hired by The Plain Dealer (which was at the time owned by members of his family); he remained at The Plain Dealer (except for service with the United States Army Air Forces in Africa and Sicily during World War II) until 1960, working as a reporter, copy editor, business editor and finally as an associate editor.

He married Sills, his second wife, in 1956, having previously been divorced from Jane Thomas. In 1960 Greenough and Sills moved to Boston, where he worked as the general business editor for the Boston Herald and later a columnist for The Boston Globe. He resigned in 1969 to dedicate himself to his family's affairs.

Greenough died in Manhattan, New York City on September 6, 2006, after a long illness. He was survived by Sills, their two children, three children from his first marriage, and two grandchildren.
