= Merry Mount (opera) =

1934 opera composed by Howard Hanson

- Opera by Howard Hanson
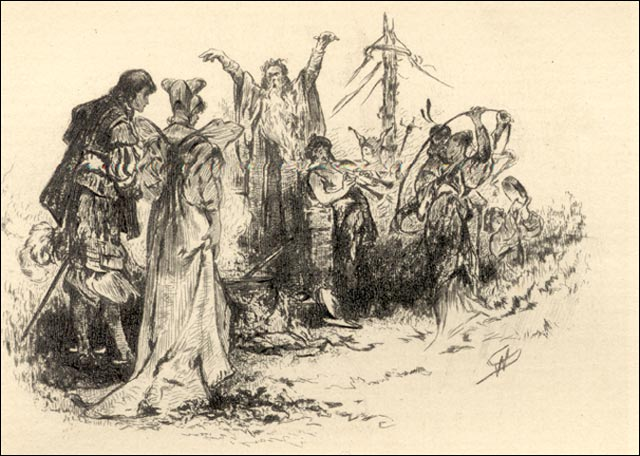
- Illustration to the short story on which the opera is based
- Librettist: Richard Stokes
- Language: English
- Based on: "The May-Pole of Merry Mount" by Nathaniel Hawthorne
- Premiere: March 20, 1933; Ann Arbor, Michigan

Merry Mount is an opera in three acts by American composer Howard Hanson; its libretto, by Richard Stokes, is loosely based on Nathaniel Hawthorne's short story "The May-Pole of Merry Mount", taken from his Twice-Told Tales. Hanson's only opera, it was commissioned by the Metropolitan Opera in New York City.

The opera received its world premiere in concert at the fortieth annual May Festival of the University Musical Society in Ann Arbor, Michigan (at Hill Auditorium), on May 20, 1933, with the composer conducting the Chicago Symphony Orchestra. The cast included Leonora Corona, Rose Bampton, Frederick Jagel, Chase Baromeo, John Charles Thomas, and George Galvani.

Its world stage premiere by the Metropolitan Opera was given on February 10, 1934. As that performance took place at a Saturday matinée, it was broadcast nationally as part of the company's weekly radio series, with Milton Cross serving as announcer. The premiere featured Lawrence Tibbett in the central role of Wrestling Bradford, the Puritan minister, with Gladys Swarthout as his betrothed, Plentiful Tewke. Swedish soprano Göta Ljungberg and Canadian tenor Edward Johnson took the roles of the Cavalier lovers, Lady Marigold Sandys and Sir Gower Lackland; Tullio Serafin was on the podium. At its premiere, the opera received a total of fifty curtain calls, still a house record. The opera was performed eight more times during the season, but never returned to the Met's repertory, and subsequent performances have been scarce.

== Creation and first performance ==
Merry Mount is unusual in that its libretto was written without a composer in mind. Stokes had conducted comprehensive research into Puritan fanaticism, sexual obsession, and demonology; he found that it often reached pathological levels, and usually ended in death as a form of punishment, or redemption, for its victims. While he found his title in a story by Nathaniel Hawthorne, Stokes crafted an original libretto which some compared to The Scarlet Letter.

(Nathaniel Hawthorne's story "The May-Pole of Merry Mount" in his Twice-Told Tales (1837) is a brief tale of the last day of revelry around the Maypole and it's suppression and destruction by Puritan forces that night, showing that "As the moral gloom of the world overpowers all systematic gaiety, even so was their home of wild mirth made desolate amid the sad forest.")

Upon completion of the text, Stokes went in search of a composer, finally finding one in Howard Hanson. Hanson, for his part, was new to the composition of opera, although he had already written a fair amount of choral music. Still, he was already respected as an elder statesman of American classical music, and such was his reputation that the Metropolitan was convinced to commission the work. Merry Mount would be the fifteenth American opera, and the last but one, presented at the Met during the tenure of Giulio Gatti-Casazza as company director.

The bluntness of the language used in the libretto surprised many, and was remarked upon even during rehearsals; The New York Times wrote on February 11, 1934:

[T]he call for the first full-dress rehearsal of Mr. Hanson's first act, to be held today, found several of the singing actors wondering whether modern censorship would approve the candor of some of the "plain English" sung or spoken by the Pilgrim Fathers to their disturbing neighbors, the Cavaliers of Quincy, Mass.
Vigorous in denunciation, the more clerical characters do not mince their words. One of them uses a series of unmistakable Anglo-Saxon epithets in accosting a woman described as Desire Annable, "a sinner".
To the angry person's entirely specific charges, the woman not only confesses, but accepts meekly a rejoinder in terms rarely used in a theatre today.
The end of their interview is the traditional "Go and sin no more"

Despite the fiscal frugality imposed on the company by the Great Depression, a lavish production was designed for the opera, and it was lushly cast. Lawrence Tibbett was already well known to New York audiences for his work in American opera, but the others were more familiar from other fields; Göta Ljungberg was known primarily as a Wagnerian singer, while Edward Johnson had been the company's principal tenor since 1922, and Gladys Swarthout had won fame as a singer of the French repertory.

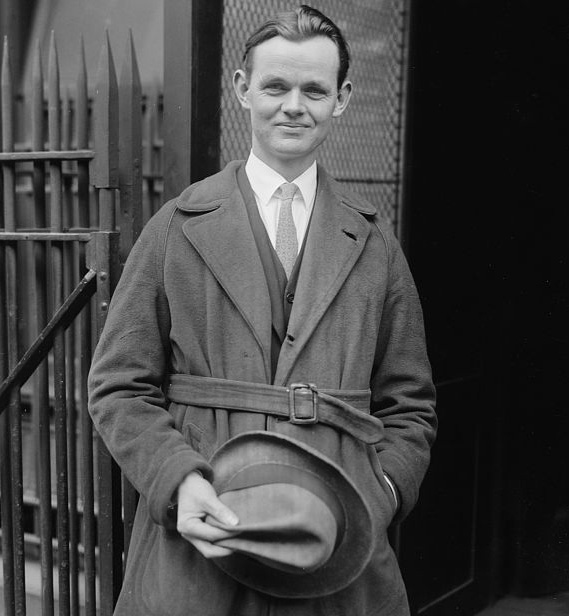
Lawrence Tibbett, creator of the role of Wrestling Bradford

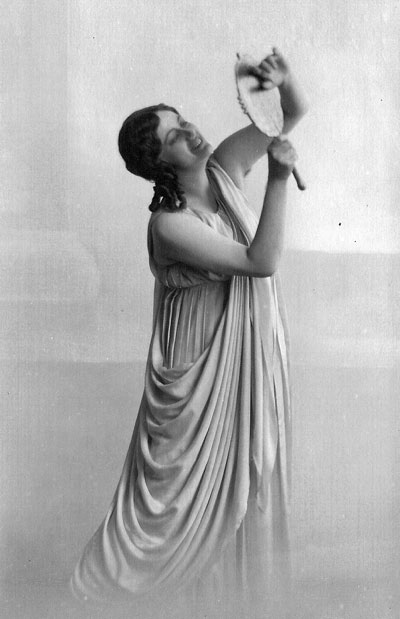
Göta Ljungberg, the first Lady Marigold

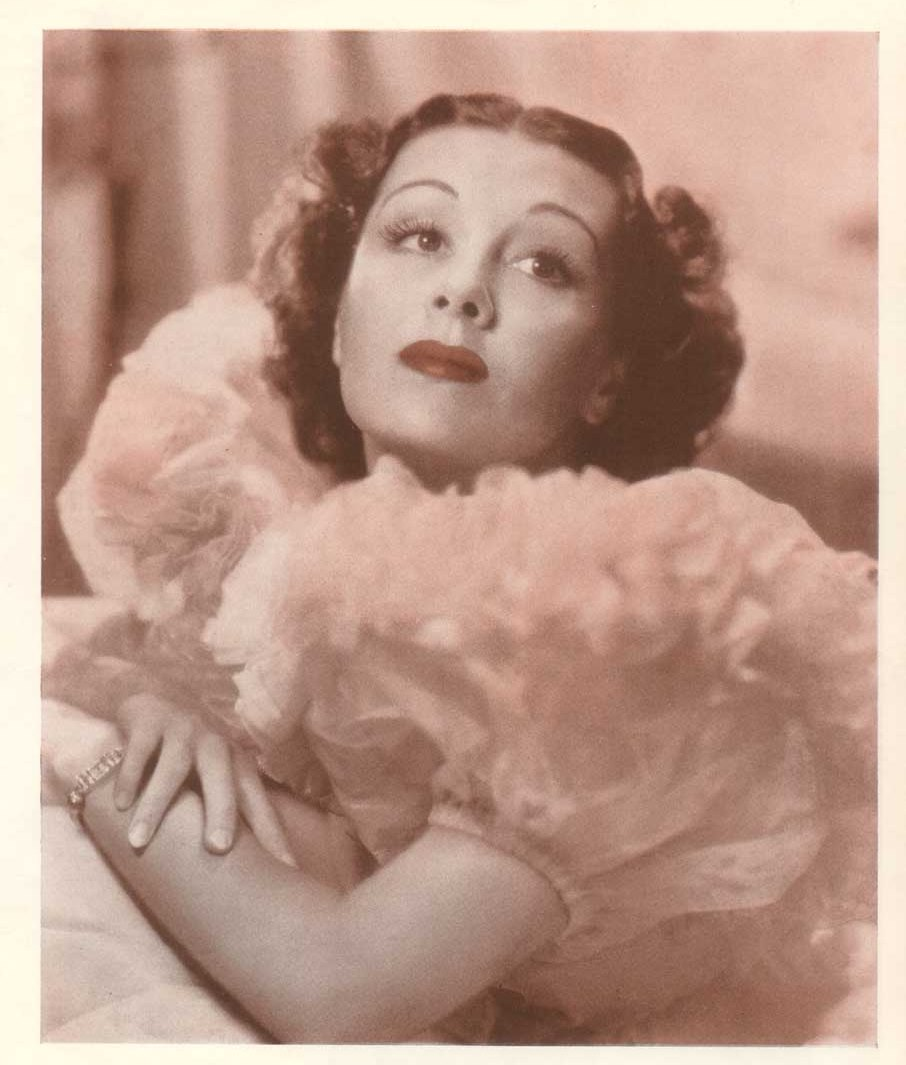
Gladys Swarthout, originator of the role of Plentiful Tewke

== Roles ==
Roles, voice types, premiere casts
Role	Voice type	World premiere, May 20, 1933 May Festival of the University Musical Society Ann Arbor, Michigan (Hill Auditorium) Chicago Symphony Orchestra, conductor Howard Hanson	Staged premiere, February 10, 1934 New York, Metropolitan Opera conductor Tullio Serafin, director Wilhelm von Wymetal, Jr., design Jo Mielziner, choreography Rosina Galli
Wrestling Bradford, a Puritan minister	baritone	John Charles Thomas	Lawrence Tibbett
Lady Marigold Sandys, a Cavalier lady, niece of Thomas Morton	soprano	Leonora Corona	Göta Ljungberg
Plentiful Tewke, Bradford's betrothed	contralto	Rose Bampton	Gladys Swarthout
Sir Gower Lackland, beloved, later husband, of Lady Marigold	tenor	Frederick Jagel	Edward Johnson
Myles Brodrib, Puritan marshal	tenor	George Galvani	Alfredo Gandolfi
Jonathan Banks, Shaker	tenor	Robert Miller	Giordano Paltrinieri
Faint-Not Tinker, Puritan watchman	baritone	George Galvani	Arnold Gabor
Samoset, Indian chief	bass	Herman Skoog	James Wolfe
Desire Annable	mezzo-soprano	Rose Bampton	Irra Petina
Praise-God Tewke	baritone	Chase Baromeo	Louis D'Angelo
Peregrine Brodrib, son of Myles	soprano	Marjorie McClung	Helen Gleason
Love Brewster, twelve-year-old girl	soprano	Hope Bauer Eddy	Lillian Clark
Thomas Morton	baritone	Herman Skoog	George Cehanovsky
Bridget Crackston	mezzo-soprano	Hope Bauer Eddy	Henriette Wakefield
Jack Prence	tenor	Robert Miller	Marek Windheim
Jewel Scrooby, Cavalier priest	baritone	George Galvani	Millo Picca
Two Puritans	tenor, bass	Herman Skoog, Nelson Eddy	Max Altglass, Pompilio Malatesta
Puritans, Cavaliers, Indians

== Plot ==
The action takes place in the Massachusetts Bay Colony in the 17th century.

=== Act 1 ===
The main street of a Puritan settlement, with meeting house, stocks, and pillory; the meeting house doubles as a fortress, complete with cannon embrasures and a parapet. The opera begins at noon on a Sabbath Day sometime in May; during the prelude the voices of the congregation are heard calling for God's retribution on unbelievers. They are being urged on by their minister, Wrestling Bradford. The service ends, and the congregation leaves the meeting house; the men, armed, are led by Myles Brodrib, and exit to the left, while the women turn to the right. All wait for Bradford to reappear, especially Plentiful Tewke, who has dared to accent her plain grey gown with a bow of flame-colored ribbon. The minister emerges and continues his tirade against unbelievers, inveighing against Satan and his attempts to demolish the new English Israel while the people listen in admiration. Indians and their sorcery are responsible for the loss of the Puritans' crops and provisions, continues Bradford, pointing as he does so to Samoset, who reacts indignantly and stalks out.

His sermon ended, Bradford next turns his attention to Desire Annable, who is held in the stocks by her wrists and ankles; mother of an illegitimate child, she has been serving her sentence after being found guilty of whoring. Recalling Christ's words to the woman caught in adultery, Bradford tells her to go and sin no more, and releases her. She staggers up; Love Brewster tries to help her, but is angrily pushed away by her grandmother. They exit, shunned by the other women.

In the pillory stands Jonathan Banks, a Shaker, and it is to him that Bradford now turns his attention. Banks denies the minister's religion, bringing upon himself cries of blasphemy and death threats from the assembled townsfolk. Nevertheless, he is set free, and leaves to the accompaniment of blows from the crowd. The people now continue their singing, praising God and cursing the Devil; Bradford joins with them in a final Amen before they go out, leaving the minister alone with Plentiful Tewke and her father Praise-God. The latter two whisper together for a moment before Plentiful pushes her father forward, herself withdrawing into the meeting house to observe what will happen; meanwhile, on the roof of the building, Faint-Not Tinker, who has been keeping watch, falls asleep.

Tewke begins praising Bradford's sermon, leading the latter to resume his harangue against the evils of the world, with which the older man concurs. But Bradford is haunted by visions of the concubines of Hell, telling how one of them – Astoreth, Queen of the Moon – came to tempt him to carnal sin in a dream the previous night. He then kneels and prays that the temptation be taken from him. Tewke next suggests that the minister is more than ripe for marriage, and suggests his daughter as a suitable candidate, noting her foolish fancy for him. Bradford had previously chosen to remain celibate, but now sees that marriage might perhaps be the will of God. Tewke calls Plentiful out; she admits her love, and he leaves the couple together. Bradford urges marriage at once, while Plentiful seeks the delay of a month, or at least a week; to the last he agrees. At her bidding, he follows custom by giving her half of a coin; she kisses his hand, inflaming his passion. He kisses her brutally; she recoils. This causes him dismay, as he sees no cure for himself in the marriage.

Children enter, led by Love Brewster (who brings flowers for Plentiful) and the serious young Peregrine Brodrib; seeing the couple together, they delightedly begin to sing, "Plentiful Tewke hath catched the preacher!" before Bradford rebukes them for profaning the Sabbath. He reminds them of the bears that ate the children that mocked Elisha, and urges them to study their religious books; he then exits, followed by Plentiful. Peregrine begins taking the group through catechism, but is interrupted by the entrance of the bearded hunchback Jack Prence, dressed in motley. Prence devises a game with three chalk circles; one symbolizes Heaven, one Paradise, and one Hell. Two children stand in each circle before beginning a game of tag; soon, Peregrine wants to join in, and demands to replace Love's partner. All save him are amused when he is knocked over and finds himself relegated to Hell; he leaves angrily, and threatens to tell his father what has transpired.

Brodrib arrives with three Puritans carrying pikes, interrupting the game. They question Prence about his company of merry gentleman that has recently landed, and that appears ready to celebrate with a maypole dance. They are appalled at even the thought of such behavior, and tie Prence to the whipping-post and begin to whip him. Bradford, in thoughtful mood, enters, and is met by Lady Marigold Sandys, richly attired in riding habit, velvet skirts, and a hat of feathers and jewels. He immediately becomes enraptured by her; she, for her part, belabors him and sets Prence free. Brodrib makes as if to threaten her, but Bradford stops him. Marigold calls on her friends, the handsome and arrogant Sir Gower Lackland among them, who enter with swords drawn just as Faint-Not Tinker awakens and falls from the parapet. Lackland is accompanied by Thomas Morton, Lady Marigold's uncle, and by the parson, Jewel Scrooby. Lackland and Brodrib fight, while the others join in; Bradford stands apart, still transfixed by Marigold. Tinker sounds the alarm on his drum, calling other Puritans to rush in; Cavaliers are ranged against them, carrying the preparations for their maypole. Tinker threatens to fire, but Tewke appears and rebukes the fighters. The parties make introductions; Scrooby, with his evident interest in worldly things, causes particular offense with his appearance. The Cavaliers present a royal warrant from Charles I, which Tewke rejects furiously.

The groups express their contrasting views of each other; the Puritans view the Cavaliers as idle fools, while the Cavaliers see the Puritans as rebels. Bradford interrupts and rebukes his townsmen, welcoming the newcomers and even promising Pence shelter in his own house. His manner is wild, alarming his friends. But he urges the Cavaliers to repentance, only to be mocked first by Prence and then by Scrooby, before the others join in. Tewke thunders at them to return to England; at last a truce is called. Marigold and Lackland are left gazing at each other lovingly, to the consternation of Bradford. Observed by Plentiful Tewke, he falls to his knees and begs Marigold to allow him to free her from Satan. She gives him hope by telling him to come to her at sundown, but then dashes it by saying that she wishes him to marry her to Lackland. They leave, and the minister, in anguish, orders his followers to break the truce and attack the Cavaliers. The Puritans resolve to do so. Plentiful approaches Bradford and touches his arm; he appears not to recognize her, and throws down his half of the betrothal coin, grinding it underfoot to her tearful dismay. The act ends with both parties expressing resolve to do as they please; the Cavaliers wish to dance and sing, while the Puritans wish to destroy their enemies.

=== Act 2 ===
==== Scene 1 ====
A hilltop, with a maypole made from a pine tree at the center; a throne sits before it, and to its left are tables for a banquet. The curtain rises after a short prelude. Women are seen preparing the maypole. Trumpets, cannon fire, and the bell of a distant ship signal the beginning of May Day festivities, and the procession, led by Morton and Scrooby, enters. Morton is bedecked as Master of Merry Disports, while Scrooby, vested as English priest, wears a chaplet of vine leaves on his head and a garland over one shoulder; he is Abbot of Misrule. Lackland enters behind them; he is May Lord; he wears white, with a rainbow scarf across his breast and a small dress sword at his side. Prence is his comic train-bearer, and he is attended by the Nine Worthies. Every form of traditional English reveller is present, including nymphs, satyrs, dwarfs, fauns, mummers, shepherds and shepherdesses, Morris dancers, sword dancers, Green Men, wild men, jugglers, tumblers, minstrels, archers, and mountebanks; there are even an ape, a hobby horse and a dancing bear. An effigy of Flora stands to one side. Lackland proclaims a Commonweal of Joy and renames the hill "Merry Mount" before taking his seat with the Worthies. Morton and Scrooby marshal the revellers, who dance around the pole. Samoset enters with members of his tribe during the dance, and offers Lackland gifts; the Indians are made welcome and offered wine and food. As the dancing becomes wilder, they leave in search of the wine.

Horns sound, and the revellers stop dancing to make way for thirty-six girls; they form a coach for Lady Marigold, dressed as Flora, twirling parasols to represent the wheels. Two children serve as the horses for the coach; a third plays coachman, while a fourth, as postillion, sits at the rear. The revellers greet the Lady of May on her wedding-day. Lackland, too, greets her, praising her beauty; she responds in kind. The two advance to the maypole, where Scrooby stands, prayer book in hand, ready to perform the marriage service. As he is about to pronounce them man and wife, Bradford enters and bids him stop; the minister rails against the pagan revelry and the maypole. Armed Puritans enter; the Cavaliers, unarmed, cannot defend themselves. Morton accuses Tewke of breaking the truce; undaunted, the Puritans drive the Cavaliers away, and set about taking down the maypole and removing all signs of revelry. Samoset and his followers appear; the chief claps Brodrib on the shoulder, only to have the wine cup struck from his hand. He is then slashed with a gauntlet, and leaves in anger, to be followed a moment later by Bradford. Tewke, satisfied, watches as the Puritans complete their task to the sounds of wind and thunder somewhere distant.

==== Scene 2 ====
In the forest. This follows the first scene at once. Bradford enters, followed by two Puritans who drag Marigold between them. One carries a dark lantern; the minister bids him open it and leave the couple together. He wishes, he says, to wrestle with her soul. The two men leave, and Bradford declares his love to Marigold, who responds with dismay and loathing. He threatens to kill her rather than see her with Lackland; he seizes her, and she strikes him. Lackland staggers in during their struggle. His costume is dishevelled and torn. He fights the minister, but breaks off when Tewke enters with other Puritans, who are armed and carry axes and lanterns. Lackland seizes an axe, but is immediately run through, to Tewke's dismay, by a pike carried by one of the Puritans. He dies in Marigold's arms; she kisses his brow, then stands and calls for vengeance and for her own death. Tewke orders her taken to the village as a prisoner, and his men exit, dragging her away and removing Lackland's body. Left alone with him, Tewke rebukes the minister, and urges his repentance. He leaves, and Bradford prays for divine aid. Exhausted by his anguish and his fight, he falls asleep to the sound of mystic voices, echoing his Amen.

==== Scene 3 ====
Hell. While he sleeps, Bradford's dream of the Valley of Tophet is seen. An infernal glen with ramparts of sandstone, crags and molten stone, trickling down. Vapors arise from the cinders on the ground, meteorites smoulder and human bones glisten on the plain. The maypole has become a giant toadstool, and the pagan characters of the revels have become intermingled with figures from Christian demonology. The Cavaliers have become Princes, Warriors, and Courtesans of Hell; Lackland is Lucifer, while the Worthies have morphed into Dagon, Moloch, and Gog and Magog. Morton is Beelzebub, Scrooby the Antichrist. Mahomet and Anubis are present, as is Samoset, in the form of a medicine man. The Beast of the Apocalypse, composed of the dancing bear and an eagle and lion, is also in attendance. Marigold is Astoreth; Prence carries Lucifer's train. Witches and a Minotaur, his body painted like an Indian's, are in attendance. More monsters appear, including a large toad with a jewel in its forehead and a calf-like beast with a coronet and eyes before and behind. Bradford remains invisible and inaudible to them all. Lucifer enters the plain, to the accompaniment of ancient instruments and heralds. Warriors with sinister banners and bizarre weapons arrive, accompanying nine princes and their acolytes, who swing censers filled with brimstone. Lucifer, pale and with a bloody bandage across his chest, stands on the ridge; his attendants help him down the rocks. Thrones appear from the ground, one each for him and for Astoreth, and for the nine princes. The monsters kneel as Lucifer passes among them; Bradford tries to stand, but cannot. As Lucifer stands before his throne the assembled company bow down; thunder and lightning accompany them as they greet their master. At a signal from him they stand and begin to dance, stopping when he signals again. Bradford is seized, brought forward, and ordered to reject his God. Courtesans dance to tempt him, but it is Marigold, in Babylonian costume with a crescent of jewels on her head, that persuades him to fall. He curses Puritan New England and signs the Devil's book, taking the Devil's mark on his brow. Lucifer leaves, laughing contemptuously, but Astoreth stays with Bradford, who, remembering the Song of Solomon, bids her rise up and come away. He leads her to the door of a tent; they embrace and then enter as the act ends.

=== Act 3 ===
==== Scene 1 ====
The forest. Bradford lies asleep; Plentiful has covered him with her cloak, and crouches in terror at his side. A lantern lies on the ground; the scene is lit by moonlight. Bradford calls out in his sleep to Astoreth and tries to embrace Plentiful, who shrinks from him in horror. He awakens, and tells her that in his dream he was crowned Emperor of Hell. In fear they hurry away together.

==== Scene 2 ====
The main street of the village. Indian war drums may be heard, and as the curtain rises Samoset and his braves are seen finishing a war dance. The church is completely gone; other structures are burning. An Indian drags in Love Brewster; she tries to scream, but is scalped. A shot is heard, and Samoset falls, dead. The Indians flee as the Puritans, some wounded, return. Love's grandmother is distraught to see her granddaughter's body, while Tewke and others cry out in biblical lament over the destruction that they see. Bradford appears, and the townsfolk turn to him for prayer and aid. But he is horrified at the realization of his curse, and tells them of his dream, and of his apostasy; he will never again pray. The Puritans lament the loss of their leader. Marigold, distraught and fatigued, appears, her festal dress torn. She recoils from the minister in horror. The Puritans heap abuses on her, calling her a witch and demanding her death. She tells them that she is no witch; happy once, her husband is dead, and she will be happy no more, but must soon join him. The people prepare to stone her, but stop when Bradford tears off his clerical bands and skullcap, revealing the mark of the Devil on his brow. He calls on his new master; flames engulf the village. Marigold swoons in fear, and Bradford seizes her, carrying her in his arms into the fire. In horror, the Puritans kneel in prayer, and the opera closes as they intone the Lord's Prayer.

== Reception ==
Merry Mount was successful at its appearance – "A Stirring Ovation ... Reception of Hanson-Stokes Opera most Enthusiastic of 10 Years at Metropolitan", read the headline on page 1 of the second section of The New York Times – but audiences seemed more pleased with the piece than did the critics. Typical of the latter's attitude was Pitts Sanborn's review for the New York World-Telegram:

Dr. Hanson's music is most effective in the choral passages, which are plentiful. Take the chant of the men within the church after the impressive choral prelude. True there is oftener the suggestion of Moussorgsky than of Massachusetts, but who would be so ungracious as to object to that? Nor has Dr. Hanson failed to assemble lively measures for the Maypole dance or to strike the witching note called for by the wild doings at the "Hellish Rendezous". Unfortunately his writing for the solo voices is not free from awkwardness and at times the weight and density of the orchestral fabric constitutes a barrier between the word that is sung and the ears of the audience.

Less enthusiastic was Olin Downes, writing for the February 11 edition of The New York Times:

[T]he story is too cluttered up with incidental diversions. ... [T]he principal defect of this book lies ... in the inhumanity of Bradford. He is nothing but a maddened and perverted sadist. Our Puritan fore-fathers, despite all the present-day condemnation of "suppressions" and the like, were much more than that. They had very noble sides; they had superb heroism. There should be more conflicting impulse and action, and relieving traits, in this character, for us to believe in him.
... The music is at times conventionally and noisily effective. Otherwise, it displays neither originality nor any special aptitude for the theatre. Its strongest point is the choral writing. That is somewhat inappropriate, in the sense of dramatic verity, because we know that no Puritans sang these elaborate choruses, or anything much like them.

Critics were, however, nearly universal in their applause for the cast, especially for Tibbett. Sanborn, in his review, said:

Merry Mount is almost a one-part opera and that part is Wrestling Bradford. In it Mr. Tibbett exhibits once more his intelligence and skill as a singing actor, as well as splendid courage and endurance. The wooden angularity of his movements and gestures, however, was a mistaken exaggeration. That the terrific tessitura of his part interferes with his vocal security and freedom was, of course, not his fault.

Downes, for his part, wrote that

... The cast and orchestra were admirable. Mr. Tibbett had to shout his way, against prevailingly heavy orchestration, all through the opera, so that it was no wonder his tone showed sign of strain. He was nevertheless as effective as he possibly could be in an ineffective part. Mme. Ljungberg also shouted, but with evident care for the purpose and respect for the composer's intention and melodic line ... Mr. Johnson sang excellently with a fine quality. ... The chorus was superb, and Mr. Serafin, very plainly, had prepared the opera with the greatest care. (Times, February 11, 1934.)

Downes also found occasion to comment upon the makeup of the audience:

Another feature of the occasion was the uncommon character of the audience. On the social and musical side it was exceptionally representative, but it had also an element not often present in such force in this lyric theatre. For this was an audience more thoughtful and conservative than is customary in many places of public amusement.
Those who do not always patronize opera as an amusement were there. They listened and they looked with a special seriousness and interest. It is reasonable to believe that this substantial gathering in a theatre crowded to capacity was attracted by the nature of Mr. Stoke's subject ...
To other facts of the occasion should be added these: That the performance was repeatedly punctuated by applause; that after the first curtain there was a particular burst of approval for Lawrence Tibbett; that after the second curtain there were recalls after recalls for Dr. Hanson and for Mr. Stokes, who came back and forth with complete éclat, and showed clearly their approval of the audience! Enthusiasm grew. There was more applause after the second act-the Maypole scene-than after the first, and more after the third than after the second.

Later critics have not been kinder to Merry Mount; Paul Jackson, in his book Saturday Afternoons at the Old Met, writes that

[Hanson's] incessant drumbeat ostinati and repetitive fanfares ultimately relegate a large portion of the score to the realm of background music. Hanson establishes no distinctive sound signature either in the predictably Polovetzian choral and ballet sections or in his monochromatic vocal writing for the principals ... Hanson is overfond of length choral vocalizations on "Ah"; too often the music calls to mind the trappings of a Hollywood soundtrack. After Bradford's penitential immolation, a final choral apotheosis, accompanied by the inevitable drums, brings the opera to a close. One must echo Johnson's lament that all their labors and money had "gone for nothing".

Even some members of the cast were disappointed in Merry Mount. Johnson, after two weeks' rehearsal, confessed that he was "pretty well fed up with it ... Merry Mount is a very pretentious, ineffective work," later calling his role "simply lousy".

The opera was given a further eight times during the season, including three tour performances; the last of these took place in Rochester, New York, where Hanson was director of the Eastman School of Music.

== Subsequent performances ==
Despite its initial appearance of success, Merry Mount was dropped from the repertory after the 1933–34 season, and has been infrequently performed since. In 1964 a revival was staged at the San Antonio Municipal Auditorium with the San Antonio Symphony led by the composer for performances at the San Antonio Grand Opera Festival. The cast included Chester Ludgin as Wrestling Bradford, Beverly Sills as Lady Marigold Sandys, Joyce Castle as Plentiful Tewke, Brian Sullivan as Sir Gower Lackland, and Val Patacchi as Praise-God Tewke. In April 2014, Merry Mount was revived in two performances at the Eastman Theater in Rochester by the Rochester Philharmonic Orchestra and select members of the Eastman Rochester Chorus. On May 7, 2014, the same orchestra and chorus performed Merry Mount at Carnegie Hall in New York City, the RPO's first New York City performance in 80 years.

== Merry Mount Suite, op. 31 ==
The best-known music from the opera is in a suite for orchestra Hanson compiled from the opera in 1937. It consists of the prelude, the children's dance from act 1, the love duet from act 2, and the prelude and ballet (Maypole Dances) from act 2. This has enjoyed more popularity than the opera, and has received multiple recordings. Howard Hanson released a recording of "Merry Mount Suite" with him conducting the Eastman-Rochester Orchestra on Mercury in 1965. The recording also included works by Walter Piston, Roger Sessions, and Alan Hovhaness.

== Recordings ==
A recording of the 1934 world premiere broadcast of Merry Mount by the Metropolitan Opera was issued on CD by Naxos Records in 1998. Small snippets of music, missing from the original master discs, are missing from the recording; the release does, however, feature commentary by the announcer Milton Cross as originally heard on-air.

Not long after the opera's premiere, the composer led a group of student performers in a recording, now long out of print, of excerpts from the piece. Numerous recordings of the orchestral suite exist.

Tibbett recorded Bradford's first-act aria "Oh, 'tis an earth defiled" on January 19, 1934, shortly before his performance of the role at the stage premiere. This was for many years the only excerpt of the opera that was commercially available.

In May 2007, Naxos Records released a complete CD recording of Merry Mount, performed by the Seattle Symphony Orchestra under the direction of Gerard Schwarz. This recording was made at the time of an October 1996 concert production of the opera in Seattle, celebrating the 100th anniversary of Hanson's birth.

== Notes and references ==
Sources

- Paul Jackson, Saturday Afternoons at the Old Met: The Metropolitan Opera Broadcasts, 1931–1950
