= Musicarnival =

Theater-in-the-round tent venue for musical theater and music

Coordinates: 41°26′25″N 81°31′58″W

Musicarnival, a music "tent" theater and among the first of its kind, operated on Warrensville Center Rd. in Warrensville Heights, Ohio, outside of Cleveland. Musicarnival was co-founded and operated by showman John L. Price, Jr. who served as producer, and Robert H. Bishop, III who served as president. By 1958 when they opened a second location to capitalize on Florida's winter resort season, it was reported there were about twenty tent theaters operating in the U.S., and mostly summer shows. Musicarnival produced performances of musicals, operettas and operas, and also hosted a number of famous musicians and rock bands, such as the Mothers of Invention, Duke Ellington, Stan Kenton, Dave Brubeck, The Who and Led Zeppelin.

== Musicarnival (1954–1975) ==
The blue and white tent was erected north of the Thistledown racetrack in the spring of 1954. The theater's inaugural performance opened on June 25, with Oklahoma!, leading a summer series of nine musicals, Ticket prices listed in the first brochure ranged from $1.25 to $3.50. That summer at least three students were able to receive college credit from Western Reserve University by performing with the company. By 1958 the theater was expanded from its initial seating capacity, growing from 1,500 to 2,563. The company averaged eight to ten shows each summer with classic repertoire such as Carousel and Wonderful Town. During its first decade they maintained a resident stock company with occasional stars brought in. By the late 1960s, however, lowering attendance forced Price to adopt the star system, and bring in prepackaged productions. In addition to musicals, Price brought in solo acts such as Louis Armstrong and Tom Jones.

Musicarnival closed in August 1975.

== Palm Beach Musicarnival (1958–1964) ==
By 1958 Price and Bishop brought the festival to south Florida for a period that lasted six Winter seasons. That venue was located at the International Polo Fields south of the Palm Beach International Airport in West Palm Beach, Florida.
