= The May-Pole of Merry Mount =

1836 short story by Nathaniel Hawthorne

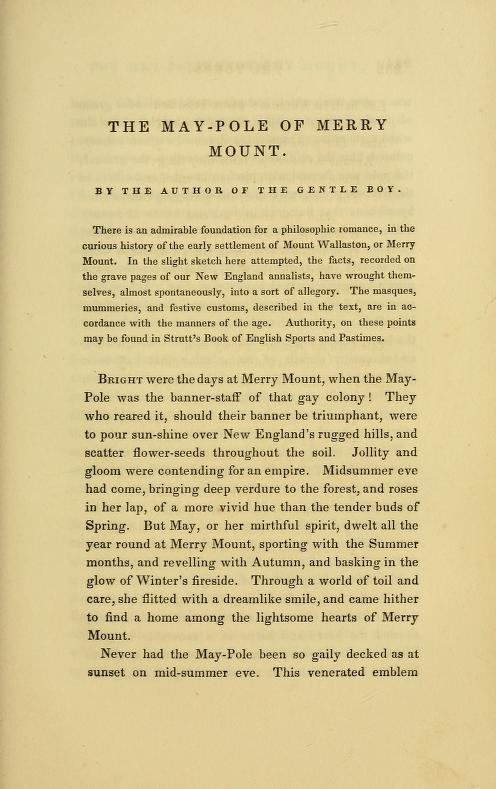
"The May-Pole of Merry Mount", as it was first published in 1836

"The May-Pole of Merry Mount" is a short story by Nathaniel Hawthorne. It first appeared in The Token and Atlantic Souvenir in 1836. It was later included in Twice-Told Tales, a collection of Hawthorne's short stories, in 1837. It tells the story of the Merrymount Colony (aka Mount Wollaston), a 17th-century British colony located in what is now Quincy, Massachusetts.

== Plot synopsis ==
In his introduction, Hawthorne describes the tale are "a sort of allegory." The people of Merry Mount, whom Hawthorne calls the "crew of Comus", celebrate the marriage of a youth and a maiden (Edgar and Edith). They dance around a may-pole and are described as resembling forest creatures. Their festivities are interrupted by the arrival of John Endicott and his Puritan followers. Endicott cuts down the may-pole and orders that the people of Merry Mount be whipped. Stricken by the newlyweds, he spares them but orders they put on more conservative clothing. He also orders that Edgar cut his hair in the "pumpkin shell" style in order to reflect the Puritans' strictness.

== Publication history ==
"The May-Pole of Merry Mount" was first published in The Token and Atlantic Souvenir for 1836, credited only as "by the author of The Gentle Boy". The same issue included Hawthorne's "The Minister's Black Veil" and "The Wedding Knell". It was later included in the compilation Twice-Told Tales.

== Themes ==
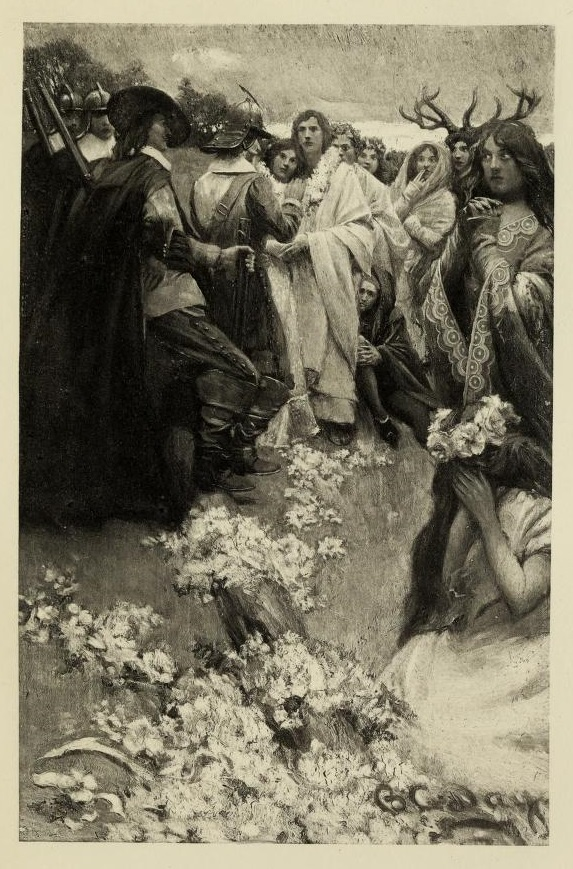
Illustration by Bertha C. May, 1900

Endicott and his Puritan followers suppress freedom and individuality, a common theme for Hawthorne. At the beginning of the story "jollity" and "gloom" are said to be contending for an empire, the Merry Mount colonists personifying jollity or mirth and the Puritans being the emblems of gloom and doom. Hawthorne satirizes both parties, though there is a particular gloomy foreshadowing mentioned early on in the story presaging the arrival of the puritans in the story, suggesting dark consequences. The youth and maiden go from being Merry Mounters to, presumably, becoming members of the Puritan community. In this sense it is not clear whether Hawthorne actually sides with the Puritans or the Merry Mount people, or if he is trying to find some middle ground.

It is not too difficult to see the Merry Mounters as the precursors of hippies (Beats, or, perhaps, more accurately free thinkers) and the Puritans as the archetype of the establishment. Hawthorne goes against the tradition of casting America as a promised land where people came to act out their dreams or to possess it by portraying both the Puritans and the Merry Mounters as a persecuted minority who sought refuge in the new land.

Being a descendant of the earliest arrivals who were seeking freedom over 200 years before, Hawthorne must have known well the stories that typically lie behind official tales such as those that we find from William Bradford, John Endicott, John Winthrop, and others. His insight about the interplay of personal freedom and family, or civic, responsibility continues to resonate today. As Nathaniel knew then, these matters of choice, such as whether 'strong watter' leads, by necessity, to debauchery or not, are perpetual issues readdressed with each generation.

== Stage adaptations ==
The American poet Robert Lowell adapted this story into one of the three plays in his trilogy The Old Glory, first produced by the American Place Theatre in New York City in 1964. Lowell's version combines parts of this story with another Hawthorne short story, "Endicott and the Red Cross," and with sections from the early American colonist Thomas Morton's book New Canaan.

Howard Hanson's opera Merry Mount is loosely based on the story.
