= Thomas Morton (colonist) =

British-American lawyer and social reformer

- Born: c. 1579; Devon, England
- Died: 1647; Agamenticus, Province of Maine
- Occupations: Lawyer, writer, social reformer
- Known for: Early New England colonist
- Notable work: New English Canaan (1637)

Thomas Morton (c. 1579 – 1647) is known today for building the first Maypole in America; it was cut down after two years by the Puritans. He also was an early colonist in North America from Devon, England. He was a lawyer, writer, and social reformer known for studying American Indian culture, and he founded the colony of Merrymount, located in Quincy, Massachusetts. He is the author of New English Canaan, an anti-Puritan work which could be considered the first book banned in America, as it was banned by the Puritans in colonial times.

== Life and career ==
=== Mount Wollaston ===
Only two years after the founding of Plymouth Colony, Thomas Morton took a three-month exploratory trip to America in 1622, but was back in England by early 1623 complaining of intolerance among ruling elements of the Puritan community. He returned in 1624 as a senior partner in a Crown-sponsored trading venture aboard the ship Unity with his associate Captain Wollaston and 30 indentured young men. They began trading for furs on a spit of land belonging to the Algonquian tribes. They called their location Mount Wollaston.

Wollaston and Morton immediately began selling liquor and firearms to the Indians, disregarding the laws of Plymouth Colony.

Disappointed in their lack of success, Captain Wollaston went to Virginia in 1626 with some of the indentured men to sell their contracts to others. He appointed another man in charge. Morton, seeing his chance when the new leader was away, got the remaining men drunk, then convinced them to remove the new leader and follow him before they too were sold to others. They locked out Wollaston’s appointed leader, leaving Morton in command of the colony, which he renamed Merrymount.

William Bradford, Governor of Plymouth Plantation, described a few years later what happened next:

After this they fell to great licentiousness, and led a dissolute life, powering out them selves into all ptofanenes. And Morton became lord of misrule and maintained (as it were) a school of Athisme. And after they got some good into their hands,and gott much by trading with the Indians, they spent it as vainly, in quaffing & drinking both wine & strong waters in great exsess, and, as some reported, 10£. worth in a morning.

== The Maypole ==
Bradford continued:

They also set up a May-pole, drinking and dancing about it many days together, inviting the Indian women, for their consorts, dancing and frisking together, (like so many fairies, or furies rather,) and worse practices. As if they had a new revived & celebrated the feasts of the Roman Goddess Flora, or the beastly practices of the madd Bacchinalians. Morton likewise (to shew his poetry) composed sundry rimes & verses, some tending to lasciviousness, and others to the detraction & scandal of some persons, which he affixed to this idle or idol May-pole. They changed also the name of their place, and instead of calling it Mount Wollaston, they call it Merie-mounted, as if this jollity would have lasted ever. But this continued not long, for after Morton was sent for England, shortly after came over that worthy gentleman, Mr. John Indecott, who brought a patent under the broad seal, for the government of Massachusetts, who visiting those parts caused the May-pole to be cutt downe, and rebuked them for their profanes, and admonished them to look there should be better walking; so they now, or others, changed the name of their place again, and called it Mount-Dagon.

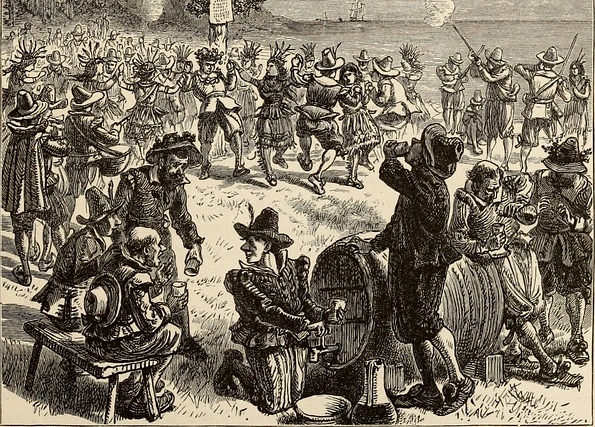
Mayday at Merrymount

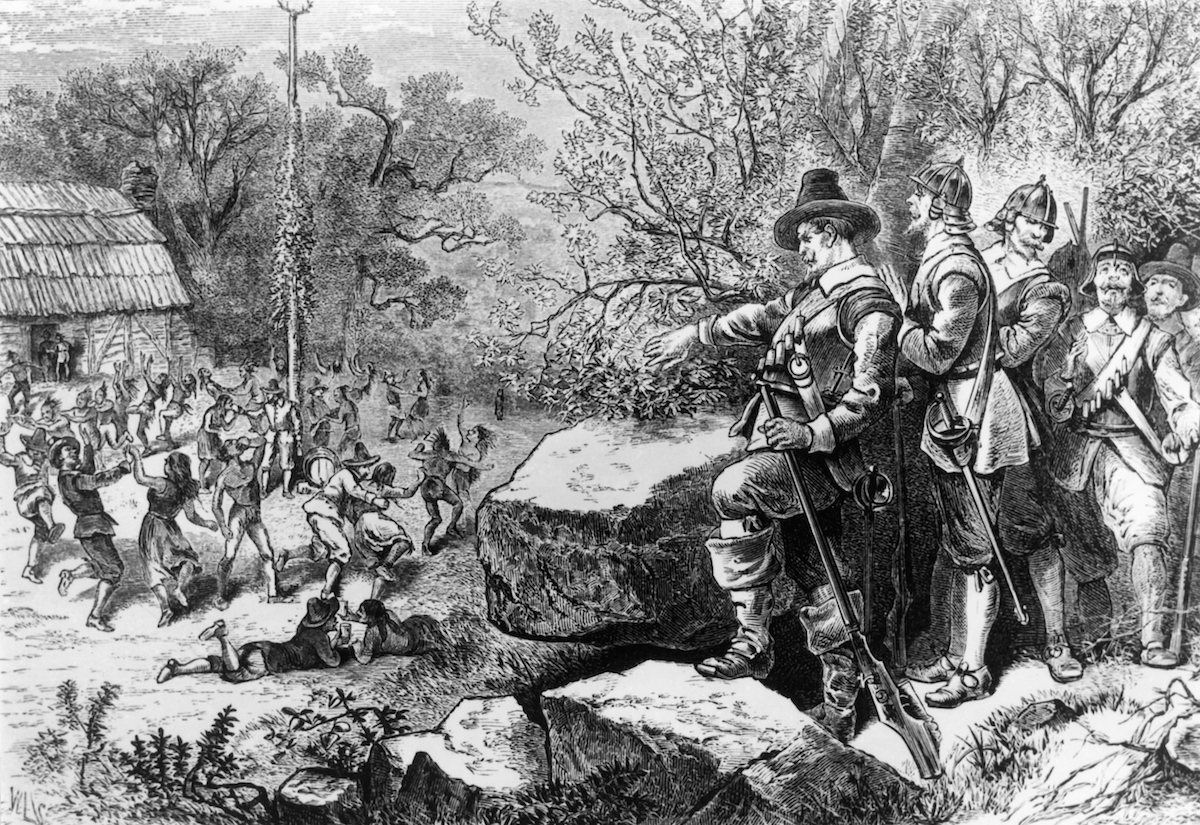
Maypole at Merrymount

(Morton's "detraction . . . of some persons" continued in his New England Canaan, (1637), when he uses "crude . . . nicknames" for Governor Bradford and Myles Standish—"Joshua Temperwell" and Captain Shrimp".)

== Morton the Trader ==
The Puritans major charge against Morton was that he sold guns to the Native Americans. Here Morton was a conscientious businessman, not only selling the weapons but teaching how to use them, too conscientious for Governor Bradford.

Bradford again:

Now to maintainer this riotous prodigallitie and profuse excess, Morton, thinking him selfe lawless, and hearing what gaine the French & fisher-men made by trading of peeces, powder, & shotte to the Indians, he . . . began the practise of the same in these parts; and first he taught them how to use them,, to charge & discharg, and what proportion of powder to give the piece, according to the size or bignes of the same; and what shotte to use for foule and what for deare. And having thus instructed them, he employed some of them to hunte & foule for him, so so as they became farr more active in that employment then any of the English, by reason of ther swiftnes of Foote, & nimblnes of body, being also quick-sighted and by continuall exercise & well knowing the hants of all sorts of game. So when they saw the execution a peece would doe, and the benefits that might come of the same, they became madd, as it were, after them, and would not stick to give any prise they could attaine too for them: accounting their bowes & arrows but bables in comparison of them. And here May I take occasion to bewaile the mischiefs that this wicked man began in these parts, . . . and made this thing commone, notwithstanding any laws to the contrary; so as the Indians are peeces all over, both fouling peeces, muskets, pistols, &c. They have also their moulds to make shotte, of all sorts, as musket bulletts, pistol bullets, swane & gose shots, & of smaler sorts; yes, some have seen them have their scruplats to make scrupins them selves, when they want them, with sundry other implements, wherwith they are ordinarily better fited & furnished than the English them selves.

=== Banishment by the Puritans ===
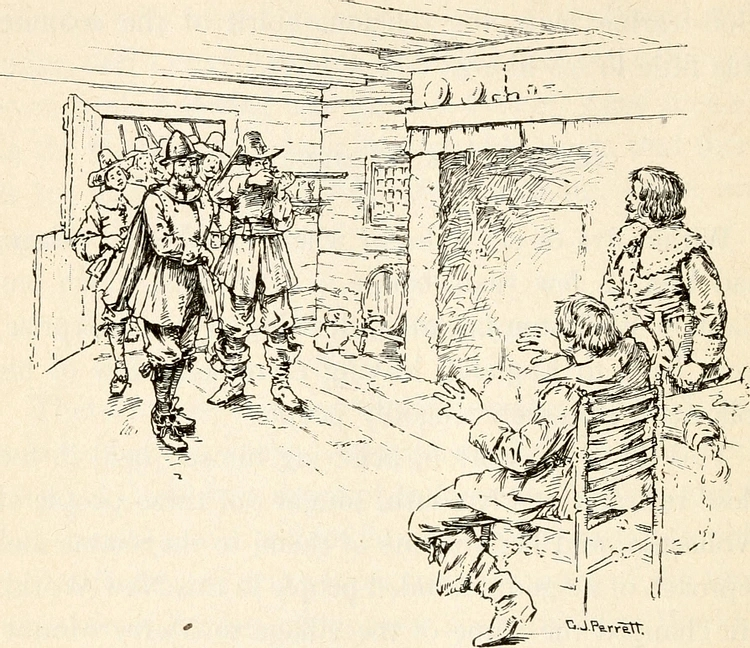
Arrest of Thomas Morton

Morton's religious beliefs were criticized by the Puritans of nearby Plymouth Colony as little more than a thinly disguised form of heathenism. The leaders of Plymouth charged him with having sexual relations with local Indian women and drunken orgies in honor of Bacchus and Aphrodite

Morton's group performed a second Mayday ritual in 1628 by erecting an 80-foot (24 m) Maypole topped with deer antlers around which he and his followers caroused drunkenly. The Plymouth militia under Myles Standish took the town the following June with little resistance, chopped down the Maypole, and arrested Morton for supplying guns to the Indians. He was given a trial in Plymouth, then marooned on the deserted Isles of Shoals off the coast of New Hampshire until an English ship could take him to England. The Merrymount community survived without Morton for another year, but was renamed Mount Dagon by the Puritans, after the sea god of the Philistines.

=== New English Canaan ===
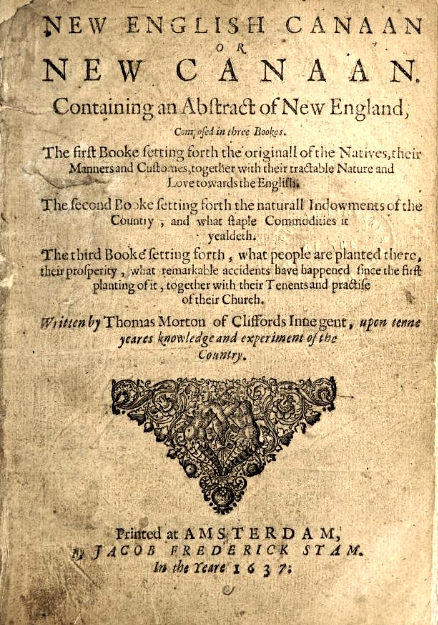
New English Canaan's title page

In 1637, Morton published his three-volume New English Canaan, a denunciation of Puritan government in the colonies and their policy of building forts to guard themselves against Indian attack. He described the Indians as a far nobler culture and a new Canaan under attack from the "New Israel" of the Puritans.

=== Sedition trial and death ===
Morton returned to New England during the English Civil War where he was arrested for being a Royalist agitator. He was put on trial for his role in revoking the Plymouth Colony's charter and on charges of sedition. By September, he was imprisoned in Boston. His trial was delayed through winter but his health began to fail, so the Puritans granted him clemency. He ended his days among the planters of Maine, and he died in 1647 at age 71.

== Legacy ==
The English government destroyed the first edition of New English Canaan in 1637, with a small number of copies surviving in the Netherlands. The Prince Society reprinted the original Amsterdam edition in 1883 with a foreword written by Charles Francis Adams Jr. Jack Dempsey produced an edited edition of Morton's book, including a biography of Morton, which was published in 1999.

=== Evaluation ===
In 1628, Plymouth Colony Governor William Bradford famously declared Morton a "Lord of Misrule."

On October 12, 1812, John Adams wrote the following to Thomas Jefferson about Morton's book:

The design of the Writer appears to have been to promote two Objects: 1. to Spread the fame and exaggerate the Advantages of New England 2. to destroy the Characters of the English Inhabitants, and excite the Government to Suppress the Puritans, and Send over Settlers in their Stead, from among the Royalists and the disciples of Archbishop Laud.

Morton's The New English Canaan has been described as "an important work of early American environmental writing", as well as the first book banned in America. Harrison T. Meserole describes Morton as "America's first rascal". Ed Simon argues that Morton "remains a powerful disruptive presence in the common founding myth of American identity."

== In literature ==
Nathaniel Hawthorne's story "The May-Pole of Merry Mount" in his Twice-Told Tales (1837) is a brief story of the last day of revelry around the May Pole and it’s suppression and destruction by Puritan forces that night, showing that "As the moral gloom of the world overpowers all systematic gaiety, even so was their home of wild mirth made desolate amid the sad forest."

J. L. Motley's Merry Mount (1849) is based on Morton's colonial career.

Merry Mount is a 1934 opera with libretto by Richard Stokes and music by Howard Hanson utilizing the details from Hawthorne's brief tale in an otherwise completely original tragic story about the clash between newly arrived Cavaliers and Puritans in the new Puritan settlement. Wildly popular at its Metropolitan Opera premiere, it had 50 curtain calls, and was performed eight additional times that season, but it has only been revived a very few times since then. Some of the music survives in Merry Mount Suite, assembled by Hanson in 1937 and available in several recordings.
