= Aspinet =

Aspinet may refer to:

- Aspinet (Nauset), sagamore of the Nauset who died in 1623
- USS Apache (1889), United States Navy tug and freight lighter renamed USS Aspinet (YF-176) in 1918
