= Squanto: A Warrior's Tale =

- Theatrical release poster
- Directed by: Xavier Koller
- Written by: Darlene Craviotto
- Produced by: Kathryn F. Galan
- Starring: Adam Beach; Michael Gambon; Nathaniel Parker; Mandy Patinkin
- Cinematography: Robbie Greenberg
- Edited by: Lisa Day; Gillian Hutshing
- Music by: Joel McNeely
- Production company: Walt Disney Pictures
- Distributed by: Buena Vista Pictures Distribution
- Release date: October 28, 1994
- Running time: 102 minutes
- Countries: United States; Canada
- Language: English
- Box office: $3.3 million

Squanto: A Warrior's Tale is a 1994 historical action adventure film written by Darlene Craviato and directed by Xavier Koller. Very loosely based on the actual historical Native American figure Squanto, and his life prior to and including the arrival of the Mayflower in 1620, the film stars Adam Beach.

Principal photography took place in Louisbourg and Cape Breton, Nova Scotia. Squanto was theatrically released on October 28, 1994, by Walt Disney Pictures, to mixed reviews and commercial failure.

== Plot ==
Set in the early 17th century, a Patuxet tribesman named Squanto (Adam Beach) is kidnapped by English sailors. He is then taken to England, along with Epenow (Eric Schweig), a Nauset from Martha's Vineyard who was also captured by the sailors.

When the ship they are on arrives in Plymouth, Squanto and Epenow are forced to work for the employer of the crew, Sir George (Michael Gambon). Squanto gets thrown in a ring with a giant Grizzly bear. Their battle becomes a spectacle for the attendees. However, Squanto is able to calm the angry bear down by singing a Patuxet Native American lullaby to it, the audience and Sir George watch in surprise as Squanto sings the bear to sleep. This finally gives Squanto the chance to escape, and he flees in a rowboat soon after. He's discovered lying unconscious on a rocky shore by a trio of monks who had been fishing.

Squanto is taken into their monastery, in spite of the reluctancy of its head, Brother Paul. The monk who offers the most open arms, Brother Daniel (Mandy Patinkin), becomes a mentor and friend to Squanto. From Brother Daniel, Squanto learns English, and at the same time, he imparts some knowledge about his world to his new housemates, introducing them to moccasins and popcorn. Brother Paul remains skeptical of 'the pagan' and in any possibility of a "New World".

Meanwhile, Sir George firmly believes that Squanto is the property of the Plymouth shipping company, and he has men on the hunt. After hiding while they ransack the monastery, Brother Paul gives permission for Brother Daniel to take Squanto to a ship in London due to sail in 15 days. While there, Squanto sees Epenow in Sir George's arena and tries to save him, only to end up captured. In another cinematic sequence, Squanto pulls off an improbable escape to accompany Epenow (who has falsely promised gold to Sir George) and a crew setting sail back to America.

When they reach the New World, they are greeted by Epenow's tribe and son, Pequod. After the celebrations, Squanto wakes to Epenow and the others torching the ship with all the crew aboard. During his captivity, Epenow has come to see the English as nothing but greedy enemies and wishes to destroy them. Squanto returns to his village, only to find devastation. His entire tribe (including his wife, Nakooma) has been completely wiped out due to illnesses brought by the Europeans.

When the Pilgrim settlers arrive, the Nauset tribe is ready to do battle. After overhearing Bradford and how he does not want to fight them, Squanto attempts to settle things peacefully. Pequod charges forward and is injured. Epenow allows the colony's doctor to treat him. Throughout the night, both sides continue to pray in their respective languages. After Pequod regains consciousness, the Nauset tribe leaves peacefully. The last scenes of the film portray the first Thanksgiving celebration.

== Cast ==
- Adam Beach as Squanto
- Eric Schweig as Epenow
- Michael Gambon as Sir George
- Nathaniel Parker as Thomas Dermer
- Mandy Patinkin as Brother Daniel
- Alex Norton as Harding
- Sheldon Peters Wolfchild as Mooshawset
- Stuart Pankin as Brother Timothy
- Donal Donnelly as Brother Paul
- Irene Bedard as Nakooma
- Leroy Peltier as Pequod
- Mark Margolis as Captain Thomas Hunt
- Julian Richings as Sir George's Servant
- Paul Klementowicz as Brother James
- Bray Poor as Dr. Fuller
- Tim Hopper as William Bradford
- John Saint Ryan as Myles Standish
- John Dunn-Hill as Governor John Carver
- Selim Running Bear Sandoval as Attaquin
- David Morley as Monk
- Shaun "Mavs" Gillis as Boy In Crowd
- Brian Sullivan as Canoe Wrangler
- Roger Chalifoux as Canoe Wrangler#2
- Greg Parent as Canoe Wrangler #3

== Reception ==
Roger Ebert of the Chicago Sun-Times gave the film one and a half stars and wrote: "Squanto is the kind of superficial, tidied-up, idealized history that might appeal to younger viewers. No thoughtful person will be able to take it seriously. For an incomparably more accurate and evocative portrayal of the earliest contacts between Native Americans and Europeans, see Bruce Beresford's Black Robe, which is to Squanto as Geronimo is to Tonto." Lois Alter Mark from Entertainment Weekly gave it a C and stated: "Squanto: A Warrior's Tale, the story of the first Thanksgiving as told by the Native American who brokered the event, has valuable lessons to teach, but it's so self-conscious (not to mention misguided in parts) that it will probably be out of the theaters long before Turkey Day.". However, on Rotten Tomatoes, Squanto currently holds a 60% rating, based on 10 reviews.

== Home media release ==
Walt Disney Home Video released the film on VHS on June 20, 1995, 3 days before the theatrical release of Pocahontas. It was released on a widescreen DVD on September 7, 2004.
