= Thomas Dermer =

Thomas Dermer (c. 1590 in Plymouth, England – died in the summer of 1620, in Virginia) was a 17th-century navigator and explorer. Thomas Dermer explored the eastern coastline of America from 1614 to 1620. He was associated with Captain John Smith, The Newfoundland Company, Sir Ferdinando Gorges, Jamestown, The Plymouth Company, and The Merchant Adventurers. Dermer, working side by side with Squanto, is credited with starting to normalize the relations between the Native Americans and Europeans. He was known to the Pilgrims from copies of his letters, that they had obtained. The Pilgrim colony directly benefited from the diplomatic ground work of Dermer and Squanto.

== 1614 to 1618: Explorations ==
Born in Plymouth, England, Dermer first went to New England with Captain John Smith, who was sent out in 1614 by London merchants to lay the foundations of a new plantation and to trade with the Native Americans there. Dermer was to accompany Smith on his 1615 voyage to New England but the ship, after encountering pirates and the French, finally made its way back to Plymouth with great difficulty.

Dermer then spent some time in Newfoundland, 1616–18, with his associate, Governor John Mason, at Cuper's Cove (now Cupids), where he was possibly engaged in the fishing business but more likely involved in explorations of the island's natural resources. He wrote a letter, dated September 9, 1616, from Cuper's Cove, in which he describes in favorable terms the fertility of the soil, abundance of wildlife, and mineral potentialities, an evidence of his interest in the commercial possibilities of the area.

== Dermer meets Tisqantum (Squanto) ==
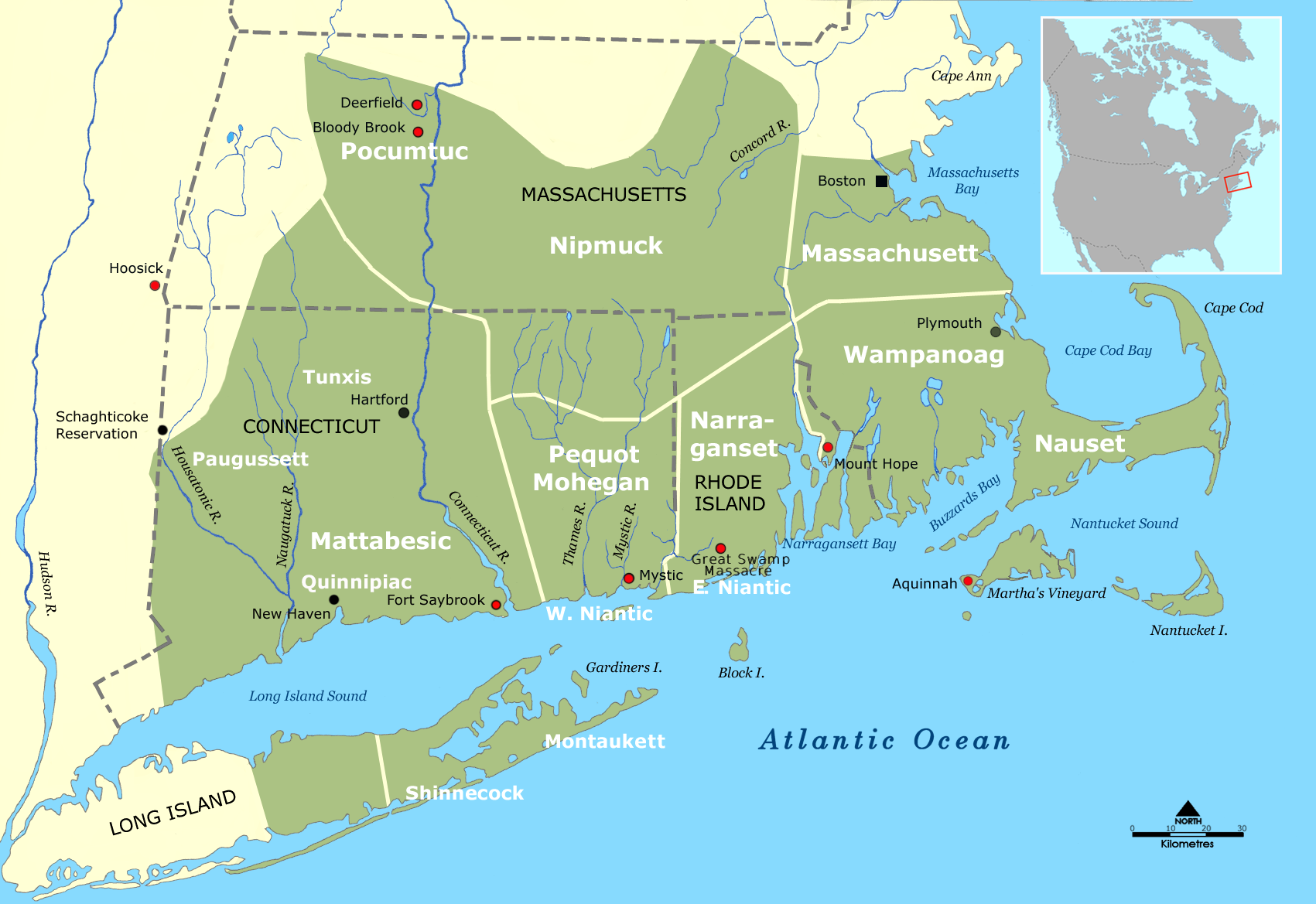
Historical Native American Tribal Territories of Southern New England

It was during this stay in Newfoundland that Dermer met Tisquantum (better known as Squanto), the Patuxet Native American, who, with 24 others from Patuxet and Nauset, had been seized by Capt. Thomas Hunt in 1614 to be sold into slavery in Málaga Spain. Tisquantum and others were redeemed by local friars in Spain and sent to England. He eventually came into the care of John Slany, a London merchant, treasurer of the Newfoundland Company, and shipbuilder. Tisquantum learned English and in 1616 was sent by Slany to Cuper's Cove as an interpreter.

Dermer saw the value in Tisquantum's ability to speak English and to become an interpreter between the New England colonizers and the Indians. Accompanied by Tisquantum, Dermer returned to England in 1618 to confer with Sir Ferdinando Gorges who was a leader of the Plymouth Company merchants attempting to colonize New England. Gorges, who favored co-operation with the Indians as a matter of policy, agreed with Dermer's plan. Gorges commissioned Dermer as commander of his 1619 expedition to New England with Tisquantum as interpreter and expert on North American natural resources.

== Dermer's Letter of December 27, 1619 ==
Captain Dermer's small fleet arrived at the Monhegan (Maine) fishing grounds in May 1619. After "leaving the fishermen to their labour at Monhegan", Dermer, a small crew, and Tisquantum, left on an open pinnace of five tons to locate Patuxet. They arrived at Patuxet in June 1619. The journey from Monhegan revealed that there had been a terrible depopulation of the Natives in the last three years. Dermer writes "...found some ancient Plantations, not long since populous, now utterly void". Patuxet, as well as all the villages up and down the coast, were deserted; most of the inhabitants dead from some sort of great epidemic. Thomas Morton, would say "and the bones and skulls upon several places of their habitations made such a spectacle after my coming into these parts, that, as I traveled in the Forest near the Massachusetts, it seemed to me a new found Golgotha".

After their initial survey of the abandoned Patuxet village, the English and Tisquantum, proceeded inland to find survivors and to learn more of what had happened. After a day's journey westward they arrived at the inhabited village of Namasket (Middleborough, MA).

The outrage of Hunt's actions of 1614 caused hatred and distrusted between the Europeans and the Indians, to the point that when in 1617 a French fishing ship was shipwrecked on the shores of Cape Cod a few men escaped death only by being enslaved by the Nausets; all the others were killed. Dermer wrote: "...for which cause (the previous kidnappings and acts of violence of the Europeans) Squanto cannot deny but they would have killed me when I was at Namasket, had not he (Squanto) entreated hard for me..." Afterwards Dermer sent a messenger "...a day's journey farther west to Poconaokit (Bristol, Rhode Island), which bordereth on the sea, whence came to see me two kings, attended with a guard of fifty men, who being well satisfied with what my savage (Tisquantum) and I discoursed unto them, (being desirous of novelty,) gave me content in whatsoever I demanded, where I found that former relations were true". The 'kings' were Massasoit and his brother Quadequina. Dermer then writes: "...Here I redeemed a Frenchman, and afterwards another at Mastachusit, who three years since escaped shipwreck at the north-east of Cape Cod...".

Dermer returned with his men and Tisquantum to the boat at Patuxet, where they explored a few more days what are now the islands of Boston Harbor, prospecting for gold. By mid-June 1619, Dermer and his crew returned to Monhegan; Tisquantum was dropped off at Sawahquatooke (now Saco, Maine) 'to stay with some of our (Indian) friends'. Dermer supervised the dispatching of the fishing vessels to England. He put most of his provisions on board Captain Ward's ship, The Sampson, which was bound for Virginia. Dermer and a few others then explored the Eastern coastline of America in a small open pinnacle, from Monhegan to Virginia.

During the voyage south, the boat and crew endure storms and leaks. At one desperate moment they throw most of their provisions overboard to regain control of the ship, before it is dashed upon some stormy rocks. He writes that his relations within the Indians are now strained without Tisquantun to intercede. On the southern tip of Cape Cod, Dermer is captured by the still seething Nausets. The Indians try to kill his men on the pinnace. But then, in a bold move (Dermer described it as 'after a strange manner'), Dermer escapes with a Nauset leader and two others as prisoners. Dermer then ransoms them back to the Nausets for hatchets and a canoe full of corn and hastily departs.

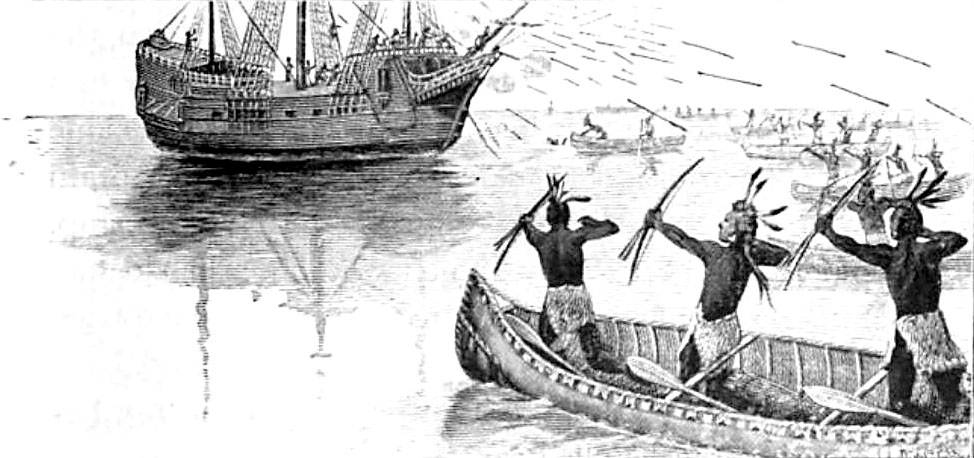
Artist's depiction of the attack on Capt. Nicholas Hobson's ship by Wampanoag warriors in 1614 on Martha's Vineyard, allowing Epenow to escape.

Dermer's expedition then headed to Capaock, or Martha's Vineyard, (named by Bartholomew Gosnold in 1602) to discover the truth behind the conflicting stories of what happened to Epenow, a sachem taken from Capaock in 1611 by a Capt Harlow and brought to England. After paraded around London as a wonder, he became an interpreter, and claimed to know where gold might be found in New England, a gambit that would provide a chance for him to return home. Captain Nicholas Hobson brought him back to Capaock in 1614. In a tense standoff in a harbor against many canoes, Epenow called out to his kinsmen in their language and sets the stage. A hail of arrows erupted from the canoes and Epenow dove off the rails of Hobson's ship. Once back in England, an empty-handed Hobson related that Epenow was killed in the skirmish.

Dermer arrived at Capaock in the summer of 1619 and met a very alive Epenow. Dermer writes "...(he) was reported to have been slain with divers of his countrymen by sailors, which was false. With him I had much conference, who gave me very good satisfaction in every thing almost I could demand." Dermer mused that he didn't have time to prospect for gold and left on good terms to continue his voyage "...searching every harbour, and compassing every cape-land till he arrived in Virginia." He sailed Long Island Sound, previously explored by Adriaen Block, and loses an anchor at the rocky tidal channel at Hell Gate. He reached Virginia in September and wintered over at Martyn's Plantation where he writes in December 1619 that he almost died a month before from sickness.

== Dermer's Letter of June 30, 1620 ==
A fully recovered Dermer left Jamestown in May 1620 heading to New England to "accomplish what his last discovery had omitted". He met with the Dutch at Manhattan and warned them that they were trespassers on English claims, afterwards he went on to New England. Extracts from this letter, which appears in New England's Memorial, makes a prescient statement, "...I will first begin with that place whence Squanto, or Tisquantum was taken away, which in Captain's Smith's map is called Plimouth...I would that the first plantation might here be seated, if there come to the number of fifty persons or upwards..." Five months later, in November 1620, the Mayflower will arrive at the tip of Cape Cod, and then six weeks later, deliver 102 Pilgrims, who also possess of a copy of Captain Smith's map, to this very place where they will found the colony of Plimoth Plantation, at the abandoned village of Patuxet.

== 1620: Death ==
Nathaniel Morton, states that after Dermer wrote the June 1620 relation (letter), "...he came to the island of Capaock, which lieth south from this place, in the way to Virginia, and the aforesaid Squanto with him; where he going ashore amongst the Indians to trade as he used to do, was assaulted and betrayed by them, and all his men slain, but one that kept the boat; but got on board very sore wounded, and they had cut off his head upon the cuddy of the boat, had not his man rescued him with a sword..." According to Jeremy Belknap, Epenow believed that Dermer had come to take him back to England.

John Smith reported that Dermer escaped with multiples wounds (up to fourteen) and immediately returns to Virginia where he dies of complications of those wounds. In the 1650s Gorges would write that Dermer "..had the misfortune to fall sick and die of the infirmity many of our nation are subject unto at their first coming into those parts." Morton in New England's Memorial goes on to state that after the attack at Capoack, "...and so they (Dermer and one other) got away, and made shift to get to Virginia, where he died, whether of his wounds, or the diseases of the country, or both, is uncertain."

== Legacy ==
Captain Dermer, with the help of Tisquantum, began the process of normalizing relations with the New England Indians after years of kidnappings by Europeans (1525: Estevão Gomes, 1600s: Captains George Weymouth, Edward Harlow, Thomas Hunt, and others). The Nausets were hostile, but the Wampanoag Confederacy would take a more measured approach with the Europeans after Dermer's work and the social and political upheavals from the devastating epidemics of 1616 to 1618.

The result of Dermer's 1619 mission was quite satisfactory to his employers, who in their published manifesto gave him the credit of ".. making peace between the Indians of those parts and the English... of which the colony of New Plymouth afterwards reaped the benefits."

== Fictional Reference ==
British actor Nathaniel Parker portrayed Captain Thomas Dermer in the 1994 movie Squanto: A Warrior's Tale.

== Sources ==
- Bradford, William. History of the Plymouth Plantation 1608–1650, 1912 2 vol edition. Note: all Dermer references that appear in New England's Memorial, are also in this 2 volume set, Morton used Bradford's original manuscript to write his book in 1669. (Vol-1: 204-209, 221, 222, 341, Vol-2: 22)
- Gorges, F., A brief Narration of the original undertakings of the advancement of Plantations into the parts of America, London, 1658." Reprinted in Mass. Hist. Coll. vi. 3d series.
- Howe, H. F., Salt rivers of the Massachusetts shore (Rivers of America, New York, 1951).
- Morton, Nathaniel. New England's Memorial, 1669, (1855, sixth ed.) pp. 41–45.
- Preston, R. A., Gorges of Plymouth Fort (Toronto, 1953).
- Rowse, A. L., The Elizabethans and America (London, 1959).
- Smith, John. Travels and works, ed. Edward Arber (2v., Birmingham, 1884), I, 217–18, 220–27; II, 747.
- Burrage, Sir F. Gorges and The Grant of the Province of Maine.
- Prowse, History of Nfld., Rogers, Newfoundland.
