= Coneconam =

17th-century Wampanoag slave

Coneconam was an early 17th-century enslaved Wampanoag man, and later, it is suspected, sachem of Manomet.

== Capture ==
In 1611, Coneconam and Epenow were kidnapped by Captain Edward Harlow on Martha's Vineyard. Harlow had already seized three Native Americans from Monhegan Island, Maine (Pechmo, Monopet, and Pekenimne, although Pechmo leaped overboard and escaped with a stolen boat cut from the stern). At Nohono (Nantucket), he had kidnapped Sakaweston (who was to live for many years in England before fighting in the wars of Bohemia.) Altogether, there were said to be twenty-nine Native Americans aboard Harlow's slave ship when it arrived in England.

== Later life ==
The names of both "Cawnacome" and "Apannow" appear on a 1621 document acknowledging themselves as subjects of King James. It is suspected that these are the same as Coneconam and Epenow. Coneconam (also spelled Cauneconam and Caunecum) was a sachem of Manomet on Cape Cod. He died of exposure or starvation while in hiding from the English near Plymouth.
