= Monashackotoog =

Native American tribe

The Monashackotoog were a Native American tribe in Massachusetts, who once inhabited the lands west of Boston in 1637 with the Wunnashowatuckoog tribe. Diplomatically, they were allied with the Pequot and hostile to the Narragansett.

They were considered a subtribe of the Nipmuc.

== See also ==
- Native American tribes in Massachusetts
