= Ninnimissinuok =

Native American people of the southern New England region

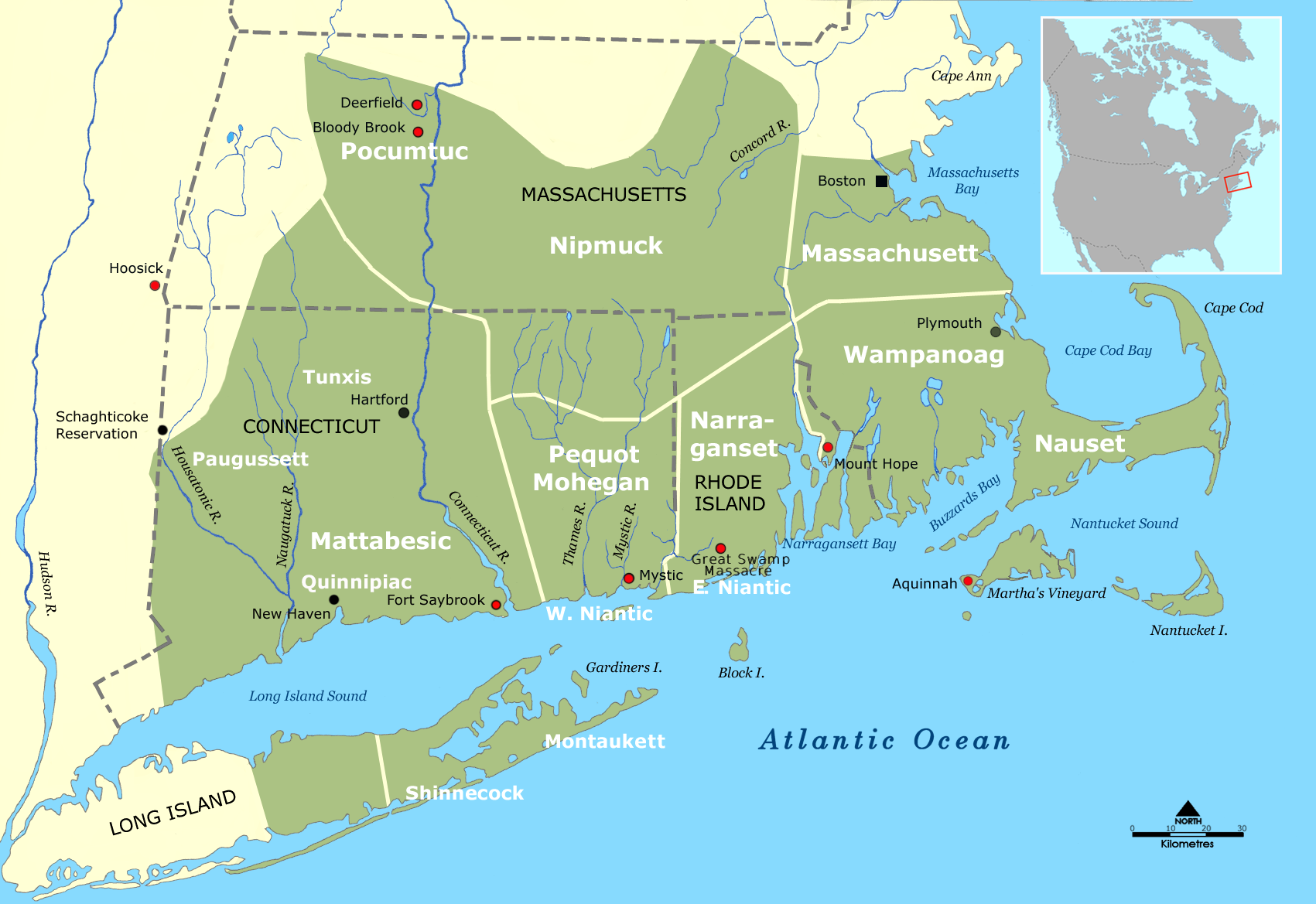
Historical Ninnimissinuok groups of Southern New England, except Pawtucket

Ninnimissinuok is an Indigenous term, to refer to Native Americans of southern New England region. These people include the Pawtucket, Massachusett, Nipmuck, Pokanoket, Niantic, Mohegan and Pequot, as well as the people of western Connecticut and Long Island. This term, a variation of the Narragansett word Ninnimissinûwock, which means roughly 'people', connotes familiarity and shared identity.

The use of the term Ninnimissinuok does not imply, however, a homogeneity of social forms or motivations among the various groups so labeled. The region now known as southern New England was home to a complex variety of communities, sometimes grouped into larger polities, which can be divided into at least three basic ecological subregions: the coastal, the riverine and the uplands. Although sharing an underlying cosmology, similar languages, and a long history, the peoples living in each of these regions developed distinctive social and economic adaptations.

Although their habitations were relatively mobile, being made of striplings fixed in a circle in the ground with their tops tied by walnut bark (with hole for smoke from central fire inside), covered with mats of reed, hemp and hides, the one main migration of the entire population of each tribe (including women and children) was a biannual one and took place only from winter residence (in warmer forested areas) to summer habitation (near the cornfields) and back again. (Note: So concluded Bennett, chiefly based on the writing of Roger Williams, who wrote: "their great remove is from their Summer fields to warme and thicke woodie bottomes where they winter …" Thomas Morton also noted annual (if not more) changes of habitation: "They use not to winter and summer in the same place, for that would be reason to make the fuell scarece; but, after the manner of the Gentry of civilized nations, remove for their pleasures …" Morton suggested that they removed to hunt, fish or even for "Revelles". Williams, however, said that other than the removal of the entire village from winter and summer habitations, individual families or even the whole might move: to avoid flea infestations, to tend to multiple corn plots, when there was a death in the household, and in response to hostilities." In any event these descriptions, and others, suggest the life of relatively sedentary horticulturists.) Maize and other cultivated vegetables made up a substantial part of the Ninnimissinuok diet. William Wood noted in his 1634 report that "to speake paradoxically, they be great eaters, and yet little meate-men ..." Stanford nutritionist M.K. Bennett concluded that 60% of their daily caloric intake came from grain products and only 10% from animal or bird flesh (as opposed to more than 20% in the average diet in mid-20th-century America). To support their dependence on corn cultivation, the men cleared fields, broke the ground and fertilized the soil with fish and crustaceans, while the women tended to weeding with clam-shell hoes, with assiduity that amazed English settlers. (Note: William Wood wrote of the women's work in tending to corn: "wherein they exceede our English husband-men, keeping it so cleare with their Clamme shell-hooes, as if it were a garden rather than a corne-field, not suffering a choaking weede to advance his audacious head above their infant corne, or an undermining worme to spoile his spumes." So regular was their diligence that when a field spouted weeds the English believed the Natives were neglecting cultivation to prepare for war.)

Sachems acquired their positions by selection from a hereditary group (perhaps matrilineal). The polity of the sachem was called a sontimooonk or sachemship. The members of this polity were those who pledged to defend not only the sachem himself by the institution of the sachemship itself. Colonial writers noted that sachemships could themselves be subjected to a ruler over many sachems, a great sachem or kaeasonimoog, which the English writers referred to as "kings". (Note: Daniel Gookin in the passage quoted, above by dividing the native population into five "Nations" with subordinated groups, recognized the distinction between sachem and "great sachem". Edward Winslow described the nature of a great sachem, which he called a "King" as follows: Their Sachims cannot bee all called Kings, but onely some few of them, to whom the rest resort for protection, and pay homage unto them, neither may they warre without their knowledge and approbation, yet to be commanded by the greater as occasion serveth. Of these sort is Massassowat our friend, and Conanacus of Nanohigganset our supposed enemy. Wood also described great sachems: "A King of large Dominions hath his Viceroyes, or inferiour Kings under him, to agitate his State-affaires, and keepe his Subjects in good decorum. Other Officers there be, but how to distinguish them by name is some-thing difficult … ." Massassoit, as Winslow pointed out, was such a great sachem or kaeasonimoog as his Pokanoket presided over other sachemships, including Squanto's Patuxet.) Sachems held dominion over specific territories marked by geographical identifiers. (Note: Roger Williams noted that "The Natives are very exact and punctual in the bounds of their Lands, belonging to this or that Prince or People, (even to a River, Brooke) &c." Winslow wrote that sachems were jealous of their domain: "Every Sachim knoweth how farre the bounds and limites of his own Countrey extendeth, and that is his owne proper inheritance … . The great Sachims or Kings, know their owne bounds or limits of land, as well as the rest." Boundaries were well known and defined by drainage basins, streams, hills or other notable features. Even a casual trespass, such as encroachment on a deer park, was grounds for hostility and even death.) The authority of the sachem was absolute within his domain. It was traditional, however, that for the sachem to strive to achieve a consensus in all important matters. One factor limiting the despotism of sachems was the option, said to have been frequently exercised, for a subject to leave a particular sachem and live under a more congenial ruler.

== First encounters with Europeans ==
For nearly a century before the landing of the Mayflower in 1620, the Ninnimissinuok sporadically experienced direct contact by European explorers and for decades before that the indirect consequences of European cod fishermen off the Newfoundland banks. (Note: In June 1524 Florentine explorer Giovanni da Verrazzano under commission of Francis I sailed into Newport Harbor and, according to his published report encountered the aboriginal Narragansett with mutual exuberance and acceptance. It would be over a half century later that further direct contacts occurred, these by the English who were driven first by privateering and the desire to match Spain's colonial enterprise during the Anglo-Spanish War and later in competition with the French who were establishing entrepôts in the north in the area of Newfoundland and the Saint Lawrence River. The English adventurers who reached southern New England included Bartholomew Gosnold in 1602, Martin Pring in 1603 and George Weymouth in 1605. The French explorers Samuel de Champlain and Marc Lescarbot explored the New England coast from the French fishing and trading settlements in the north between 1604 and 1606. Dutch explorer Adrien Block encountered the peoples between Narragansett Bay and Long Island in his cartographic voyages between 1612 and 1614. And John Smith, recently active in the founding of the Colony of Virginia at Jamestown, explored the coast of New England with a view towards the prospects of settlement in 1614. The fishermen off the Newfoundland banks from Bristol, Normandy and Brittany as well as the Basque provinces began making annual spring visit beginning as early as 1481 to bring salted cod for sale to Southern Europe.) The effect of these early encounters was profound. First, and more immediately catastrophic, Europeans brought a variety of diseases (Note: Paleopathological evidence exists for European importation of typhoid, diphtheria, influenza, measles, chicken pox, whooping cough, tuberculosis, yellow fever, scarlet fever, gonorrhea and smallpox.) for which the aboriginal population had no resistance. When the English settlers arrived, they discovered that vast swaths of Southern New England, previously prepared for cultivation and settlement by extensive deforestation and land preparation was devoid of all inhabitants. Second, more gradual but equally profound for the economic and social conditions of the Natives, the "Fur Trade" engaged in at first by the Newfoundland fishermen, and later, more systematically by the French and English, destroyed the previously existing continental intertribal pattern of exchange in which the Natives traded local products in a system of extensive and peaceful commerce. That system was replaced by an economy driven by the demand of the Europeans for one product (animal pelts). The new economy resulted in intense intertribal rivalries and hostilities, which eventually allowed the English to play one off against the other. In addition to contributing to the first two causes of calamity, the English created immense ill-will and eventually hostilities by their aggressive approach to settlement, the brutality of which was apparent even before the first settlers. This was the result of the system the English employed which depended exclusively on private profiteers. (Note: The crown was unwilling to expend any money to finance exploration or settlement but was quite interested in participating in any revenue that it generated. It therefore granted monopolies to favored entrepreneurs to undertake the financing. To obtain investors the entrepreneurs had to be able to show near-term profits and to do so be willing to cut expense and produce immediate income. And that is what the promoters proposed doing, regardless of the wishes of the native inhabitants.) Richard Hakluyt made plain the goals that the entrepreneurs would pursue in an "inducement" he wrote in 1585: "The ends of this voyage are these: 1, to plant the Christian religion; 2, To trafficke; 3, To conquer; Or, to do all three." The first goal was never seriously pursued. (Note: Unlike the French or even the Spanish, the English never attempted any missions among the Natives until much later. Roger Williams made this point in 1643.)

== See also ==
- History of New England
- Native American tribes in Massachusetts
