= Native American tribes in Massachusetts =

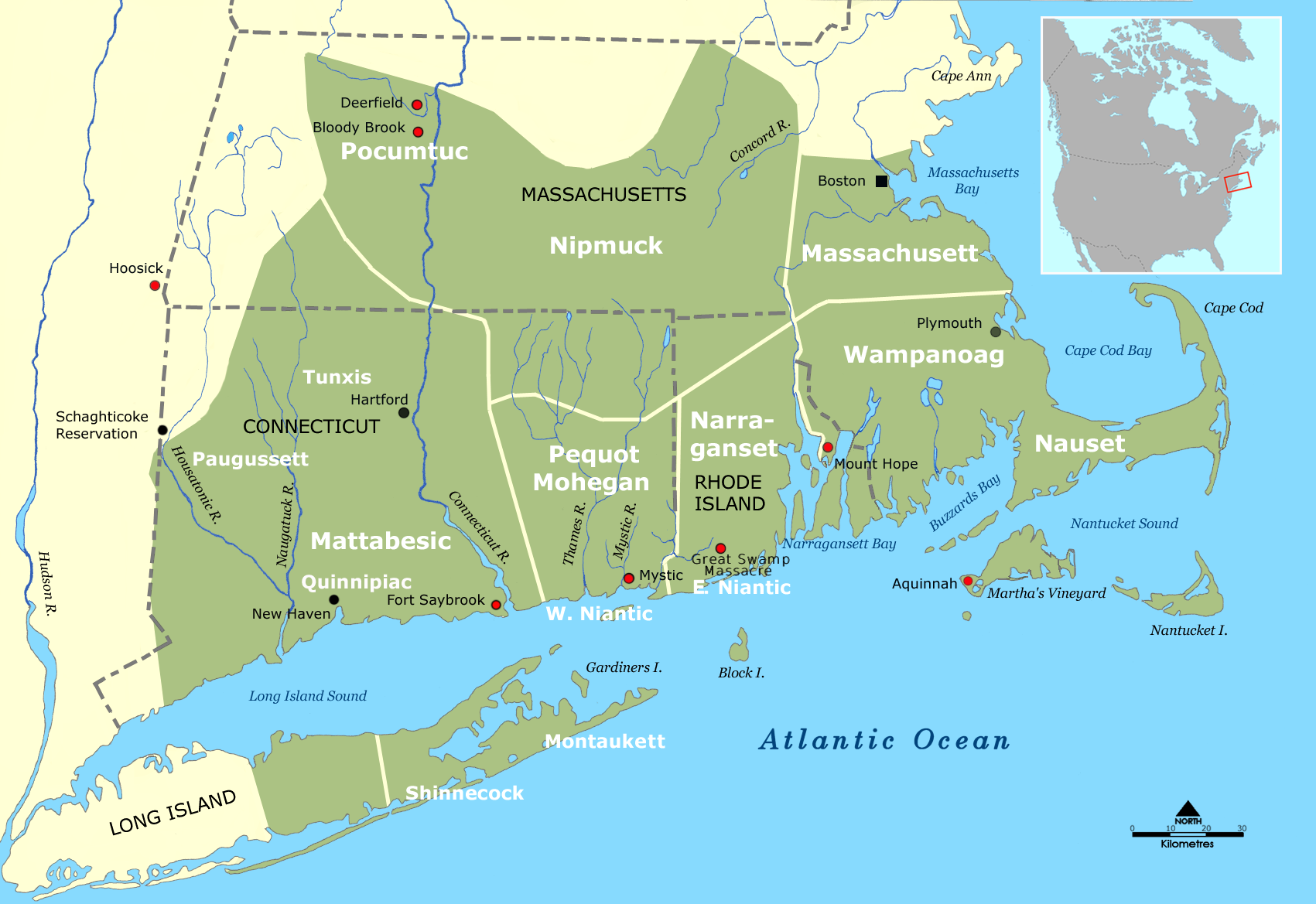
Historic tribal territories of Southern New England, ca. 16th century

Native American tribes in Massachusetts are the Native American tribes and their reservations that existed historically and those that still exist today in what is now the Commonwealth of Massachusetts. A Narragansett term for this region is Ninnimissinuok.

== Federally recognized tribes ==
Historic Wampanoag territory, c. 1620

Massachusetts has two federally recognized tribes. They have met the seven criteria of an American Indian tribe: being an American Indian entity since at least 1900, a predominant part of the group forms a distinct community and has done so throughout history into the present; holding political influence over its members, having governing documents including membership criteria, members having ancestral descent from historic American Indian tribes, not being members of other existing federally recognized tribes, and not being previously terminated by the U.S. Congress.

- Mashpee Wampanoag Tribe
- Wampanoag Tribe of Gay Head (Aquinnah)

== State-recognized tribes ==
State-recognized tribes do not have government-to-government relationships with the United States federal government, but they do have a relationship with the state. Massachusetts has two state-recognized tribes, acknowledged through executive orders by governors.

- The Hassanamisco Nipmuc Band was state-recognized through Executive Order 126 by Governor Michael Dukakis in 1976.
- The Herring Pond Wampanoag Tribe was state-recognized through Executive Order 637 by Governor Maura Healey on November 19, 2024.

== American Indian reservations ==
These are two federal Indian Reservations in Massachusetts.

- Mashpee Wampanoag, reservation land in Mashpee (Barnstable County) and Taunton (Bristol County)
- Gay Head (Aquinnah), Dukes County, Martha’s Vineyard)

There are also two historical state reservations connected to the Nipmuc people.

- Chaubunagungamaug, Worcester County
- Hassanamesit, Worcester County

== Historical tribes of Massachusetts ==
These are some of the tribes that have existed in what is now Massachusetts. Most no longer exist as functioning American Indian tribes within the state; however, some are tribes in other states or in Canada.

- Mahican tribe, from New York but some migrated to Massachusetts in the late 17th century

- Wiekagjoc
- Mechkentowoon
- Wyachtonoc
- Westenhuck (Stockbridge), descendants are members of the Stockbridge–Munsee Community in Wisconsin

- Massachusett, Massachusett Bay

- Nauset tribe, also known as Cape Indians, Cape Cod

- Nipmuc, central plateau

- Hassanamisco Nipmuc, state-recognized tribe represents them today
- Monashackotoog, historic band
- Wunnashowatuckoog, Worcester County, historic band

- Pennacook tribe, northeastern Massachusetts and southern New Hampshire, descendants may be part of the Odanak First Nation in Quebec, Canada. Other descendants moved to the praying towns of Wamesit and Natick.

- Agawam
- Nashua
- Naumkeag
- Pawtucket, merged into the Pennacook
- Pentucket
- Wachuset
- Wamesit
- Weshacum

- Pocomtuc tribe, also Deerfield Indians, western Massachusetts
- Wampanoag tribe, Rhode Island to south edge of Massachusetts Bay

- Herring Pond Wampanoag Tribe, state-recognized tribe
- Mashpee Wampanoag Tribe, federally recognized tribe
- Patuxet, Plymouth, historic band
- Wampanoag Tribe of Gay Head (Aquinnah), federally recognized tribe

== Cultural heritage groups ==
More than 20 organizations claim to represent historic tribes within Massachusetts; however, these groups are unrecognized, meaning they do not meet the minimum criteria of a federally recognized tribe or a state-recognized tribe.

== See also ==
- Category:Native American tribes in Massachusetts
- List of U.S. communities with Native American majority populations
- Indigenous peoples of the Northeastern Woodlands
- North American Indian Center of Boston
- Praying towns
