= Wunnashowatuckoog =

Historical Native American tribe

The Wunnashowatuckoog, sometimes referred to as Showatucks, were a native American tribe in Massachusetts who lived in southern Worcester County, Massachusetts. The name of the tribe, translating to 'people at the fork of the river', alludes to them residing on the Blackstone River. They were known to cohabitate with the Monashackotoog.

They had warred with the Narragansett people with which they bordered, though they said to be subjugated by the Narragansetts. In 1637, they provided refuge to members of the enemy Pequot tribe, and were subsequently driven to the land of the Mohawk people by the Nipmuc. They returned sometime in the second half of the 17th century, when in 1675 they were under the protection of the English against attacks by the Mohegan and Narragansett.

== See also ==
- Native American tribes in Massachusetts
