= Epenow =

Native American that interacted with English Plymouth colonists

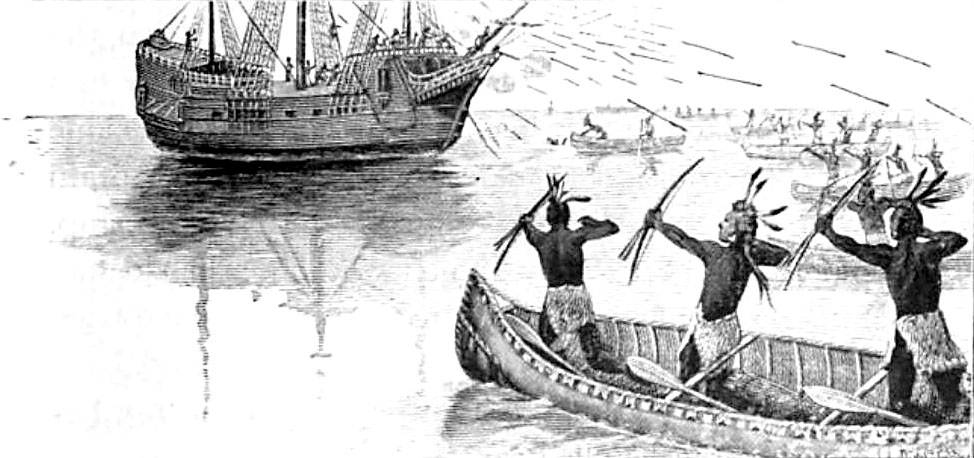
Artist's depiction of the attack on Capt. Nicholas Hobson's ship by Wampanoag warriors in 1614 on Martha's Vineyard, allowing Hobson's captive Epenow to escape.

Epenow (also spelled Epanow) was a Nauset man from Martha's Vineyard, Massachusetts who was kidnapped by sailors from an English merchant ship and taken to England in the 17th century. Being put on public display in London, Epenow eventually returned to New England by tricking his captors into thinking that he knew the location of a gold mine. Once he was back in New England, Epenow led Indian resistance to Pilgrim settlement of the region.

== Capture ==
By 1610, Native Americans on display in Europe was such a common event that Shakespeare made a joke of it in The Tempest. (Note: Trinculo comes upon Caliban hiding under a blanket and quips that he cannot decide if it is a man or a fish. He considers that if he were in London he could paint him and exhibit him for crowds will pay to see exhibited men: "Any strange beast there makes a man [prosperous]. When they will not give a doit to relieve a lame beggar, they will lay out ten to see a dead Indian." The Tempest II:ii:30–32.) The following year Shakespeare's friend, Henry Wriothesley, who had already cosponsored George Weymouth's expedition in 1605, underwrote another one under Captain Edward Harlow, although it was ostensibly to discover an island around Cape Cod.

Harlow abducted three Native American men from Monhegan Island, Maine: Pechmo, Monopet, and Pekenimne. Pechmo, leapt overboard and escaped. He brought back friends who set up a hail of arrows while they cut away a boat from the stern of the vessel. Three sailors onboard Harlow's ship were wounded by arrows. When they anchored at the Ile of Nohono (Nantucket), Harlow kidnapped Sakaweston (who was to live for many years in Europe and eventually fought in the Thirty Years' War.) Natives in canoes again attacked Harlow's ship until they were driven off with guns. Hawlow then ordered his crew to proceed to Capawe (Capawack or Martha's Vineyard) where they abducted two more Native Americans, Coneconam and the sachem Epenow. Altogether, there were said to be twenty-nine Native Americans aboard Harlow's ship when it arrived in England.

== Captivity in London ==
The captives had been brought to London by Harlow to sell as slaves in Spain, however Harlow found that the Spanish considered Native American slaves to be "unapt for their uses." So instead, Epenow became a "wonder", a spectacle on constant public display in London. Sir Ferdinando Gorges wrote that when he met him, Epenow "had learned so much English as to bid those that wondered him 'Welcome! Welcome!'"

Epenow's display in London is said to be the inspiration for the "strange Indian" mentioned by Shakespeare in Henry VIII:

"What should you do, but knock 'em down by the dozens? Is this Moorfields to muster in? or have we some strange Indian with the great tool come to court, the women so besiege us? Bless me, what a fry of fornication is at door! On my Christian conscience, this one christening will beget a thousand; here will be father, godfather, and all together."

Gorges wrote that he obtained Epenow from Captain Henry Harley, (Note: Some 19th century writers assumed that Gorges was mistaken and meant instead that he obtained Epenow from Captain Harlow, who like Harley, was from Gorges's failed Sagadahoc Colony. But Gorges writes that Epenow was part of 29 other Native Americans who came to England onboard his ship, not the five abducted by Harlow, which makes it seems that Harley was something like a broker and Harlow one of his suppliers. In any event, Baxter gives reasons explaining why the often unreliable Gorges was unlikely to have confused these two men.) although he denied knowing how Harley got him, except that Gorges was told that "he had been shewed in London for a wonder." Gorges described Epenow as both "of a goodly stature, strong and well proportioned" as well as "a goodly man, of a brave aspect, stout, sober in his demeanor."

Acquired by Gorges, Epenow was housed with another Native American captive, Assacumet, who had been abducted by Captain George Weymouth in 1605 in Maine, and with whom he could communicate with some initial difficulty. With Assacumet's help, Epenow eventually became quite fluent in English.

== Escape ==
Gorges seems to have thought that his failure to obtain the loyalty of the Natives kidnapped by Weymouth was owing to not having kept them in his custody long enough. Epenow he kept for three years.

Hatching an escape plot, Epenow convinced his captors of the existence a gold mine on Martha’s Vineyard. In 1614, Gorges consulted with Wriothesley, and made up his mind to send Epenow back with Captain Hobson, who had been with Harlow in 1611 when Epenow was kidnapped. Believing Epenow's fabrication, Gorges commissioned a voyage to Martha's Vineyard in 1614 under Captain Nicholas Hobson, accompanied by Epenow as a guide, translator, and pilot. He persuaded Hobson to stake £100 of his own money on the adventure. Gorges also sent two additional Natives he had in captivity, Assacomet (from Weymouth's expedition) and Wanape, who was from southern New England (and sent to Gorges via the Isle of Wight).

Wanape died soon after arriving in the New World. Upon arriving to Epenow's native island, the ship was peacefully greeted by a company of Wampanoags, including some of Epenow's brothers and cousins. The principal inhabitants (including relatives of Epenow) came on board. Captain Hobson entertained the visitors to his ship, and invited them to return the next morning with trade goods. They promised to come again in the morning to trade. Not trusting Epenow, Hobson made sure he was accompanied at all times by three guards, and clothed him with long garments that could be easily grabbed. But Epenow had secretly let them know that he was held captive, and the next morning they came with twenty canoes.

The captain, his invitations ignored, called for Epenow to come out from the forecastle to translate. Epenow called out in English for his friends to come aboard, but then lunged to jump overboard. Hobson's men managed to grab him, but Epenow, being "a strong and heavy man", managed to dive overboard under cover of arrows being shot from the canoes. Both parties sustained heavy casualties; Hobson's crew killed and wounded many Indians, though they themselves suffered numerous casualties in the confrontation. They returned to England empty handed. Gorges ends the tale by lamenting the incompetence of Hobson's men.

== Later career and legacy ==
When the Pilgrims arrived to New England six years later, Epenow emerged as a leader of Indian resistance to Pilgrim colonial settlement, and there is evidence that he became a sachem.

Epenow met with visiting Captain Thomas Dermer in 1619 in a peaceful meeting on Martha's Vineyard, and laughed as he told the story of his escape from captivity. But on Dermer's second visit in 1620, shortly before the arrival of the Mayflower, Epenow's warriors attacked the captain and his men, and took captive his traveling companion, the celebrated Squanto, before turning him over to Massasoit (the leading Wampanoag sachem). Some of Epenow's company were slain, but all but one of Dermer's crew were killed, and Dermer, severely wounded with fourteen wounds, escaped to Virginia where he died soon afterward.

== Fictional representation ==
Native Canadian actor Eric Schweig portrayed Epenow in Disney's 1994 live action adventure drama film Squanto: A Warrior's Tale.

== See also ==
- Nemattanew, Epenow's contemporary active in Virginia.
