= Assacumet =

Assacumet (also known as Assacomet, Assecomet, Sassacommett, Sassacomoit) was an early 17th-century Native American from the Wawenock Abenaki tribe.

== Capture ==
Assacumet was captured in 1605 by Capt. George Weymouth of the ship Archangel near the Pemaquid River in Maine together with four others. Some sources list the other four as Tasquantum (better known as Squanto), Manida, Skettwarroes, and Dehamda; others list them as Tahanedo ("a Sagamo or Commander"), Amoret, Skicowaros, and Maneddo (listed as "gentlemen". Sassacomoit is listed as "a servant".) They were taken to England with the intention of teaching them English before being returned to North America in order to aid future English efforts at colonization.

== Challoung expedition ==
In England, Assacumet and at least two of the other Native Americans were given to Sir Ferdinando Gorges, and learned English. In 1606 Gorges sent an expedition to America under Capt. Henry Challoung (also known as Chalowns and Chalon), with Assacumet and Manida, to the West Indies and Puerto Rico. The ship was captured by a Spanish fleet and taken to Spain. The ship and goods were confiscated, and the crew made prisoners in Seville. Manida was "lost" but Assacumet was eventually "recovered", after Captain John Barlee wrote to Secretary Cecil, urging him to use his influence to win the release of the two "savages.".

== Epenow ==
Returned to Gorges' home, Assacumet was lodged with Epenow, a Wampanoag captive captured in 1611, and helped him improve his English.

In 1614, Assacumet accompanied Gorges' expedition under Capt. Nicholas Hobson to Martha's Vineyard, where they had convinced him that gold lay in a ploy to escape, and where Epenow ultimately escaped.
