= Aspinet (Nauset) =

Sagamore of the Nauset, Plymouth Colony (died 1623)

Aspinet (died c. 1623) was a sagamore of the Nauset people.

On June 11, 1621, a child named Johnny Billington went missing from the Plymouth Colony after getting lost in the woods. Upon request from the colonists, Aspinet found the boy and brought him back to them. This act, alongside his willingness to provide the colonists with food, led to him being noted as a boon to the colonists.

Aspinet died sometime in 1623 after being driven into hiding by the Plymouth colonists. While it is unclear exactly what circumstances he died under, he was allegedly the leader of a group of sagamores seeking to drive out the Plymouth colonists, a plan which was foiled when Massasoit (sagamore of the Wampanoag) warned colonial leaders. Some writers, such as Alvin G. Weeks, believed that Aspinet was confused with Epenow as a member of this plot. He was succeeded as sagamore by a Nauset man named George.

Aspinet is named in Henry Wadsworth Longfellow's 1858 poem The Courtship of Miles Standish as a sagamore, alongside Samoset, Corbitant, Squanto, and Tokamahamon.
