= USS Apache (1889) =

Tugboat of the United States Navy

History

United States
- Name: USS Apache (1898–1918); USS Aspinet (1918–1925)
- Namesake: The Apache, the collective term for several culturally related groups of Native Americans originally from the American Southwest
- Builder: A. C. Brown, New York, New York
- Cost: $54,510 (hull and machinery)
- Completed: 1889
- Acquired: 24 May 1898
- Commissioned: 11 June 1898
- Decommissioned: 24 September 1898
- In service: 1900
- Renamed: USS Aspinet 11 April 1918
- Reclassified: YF-176 17 July 1920
- Fate: Sold 29 September 1925
- Notes: Operated as commercial tug J. D. Jones 1889–1898

General characteristics
- Type: tug 1898; freight lighter 1900-1925
- Displacement: 650 tons
- Length: 141 ft 6 in (43.13 m) between perpendiculars
- Beam: 29 ft 0 in (8.84 m)
- Draft: 10 ft 0 in (3.05 m)
- Speed: 10 knots
- Complement: 10 (in 1918)
- Armament: In 1918: 2 × 1-pounder guns; 1 × machine gun

The first USS Apache, later USS Aspinet (YF-176), was a United States Navy tug in commission during 1898, which then served again as a freight lighter from 1900 to 1925.

Apache was built in 1889 as the commercial tug J. D. Jones by A. C. Brown at Tottenville, Staten Island, in New York City. The U.S. Navy purchased J. D. Jones from the Merritt and Chapman Wrecking Company on 24 May 1898 for service in the Spanish–American War. She was commissioned on 11 June 1898 as USS Apache.

During the Spanish–American War, Apache was assigned to the Norfolk Navy Yard at Portsmouth, Virginia. On 26 July 1898, however, she departed Hampton Roads, Virginia, for Key West, Florida. She arrived at Key West on 4 August 1898 and served there until 17 August 1898, when she got underway for the return trip to Hampton Roads. She arrived at Hampton Roads on 22 August 1898, and service there and at Norfolk, Virginia, occupied her time until 24 September 1898, when she was decommissioned.

In 1900, Apache was moved north to New York where she was refitted for service as a freight lighter at the ordnance magazine at Iona Island on the western side of the Hudson River about five nautical miles (9.25 kilometers) south of West Point, New York. For the next 20 years, she divided her time between the New York Navy Yard in Brooklyn, New York, and the Iona Island facility. On 15 July 1904 she sank the tug Henry D. McCord (United States) in a collision off Pier 5 in the East River. On 11 April 1918, she was renamed Aspinet.

In 1920, Aspinet was transferred to Charleston, South Carolina, as a district craft. On 17 July 1920, when the U.S. Navy adopted the alphanumeric system of hull designations, freight lighters received the designation "YF", and she became USS Aspinet (YF-176).

Aspinet continued to serve at Charleston until sold on 29 September 1925.
