= Education in Rhode Island =

Education in Rhode Island covers the public and private schools at all levels from the colonial era to the present.

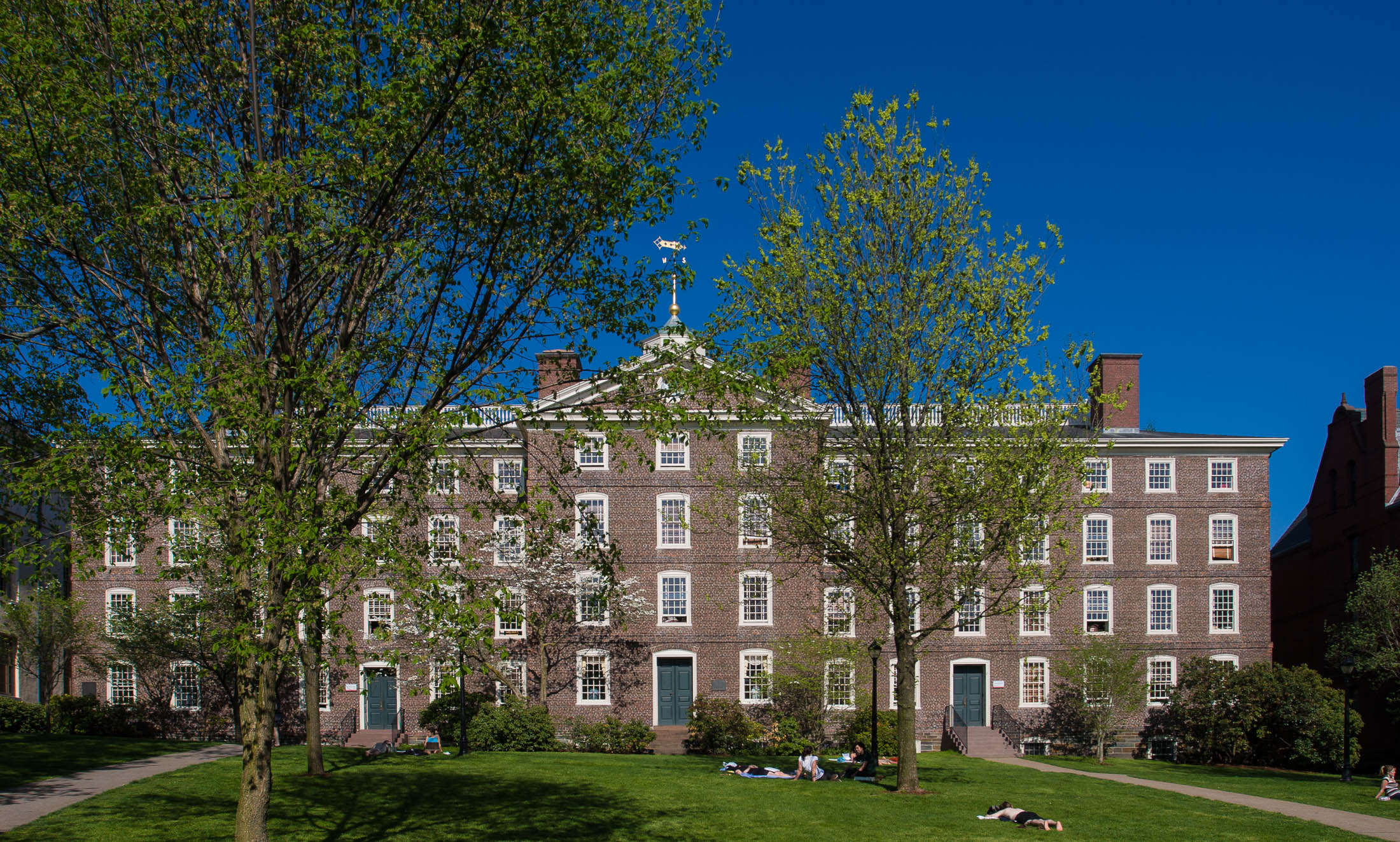
University Hall (1770) at Brown University is one of the oldest academic buildings in the United States.

== Colleges and universities ==
Rhode Island has several colleges and universities:

- Brown University
- Bryant University
- Community College of Rhode Island
- Johnson & Wales University
- Naval War College
- New England Institute of Technology
- Providence College
- Rhode Island College
- Rhode Island School of Design
- Roger Williams University
- Salve Regina University of Newport
- University of Rhode Island

== See also ==
- History of education in the United States
- List of Rhode Island schools
