= Nauset =

Extinct Native American tribe from Massachusetts

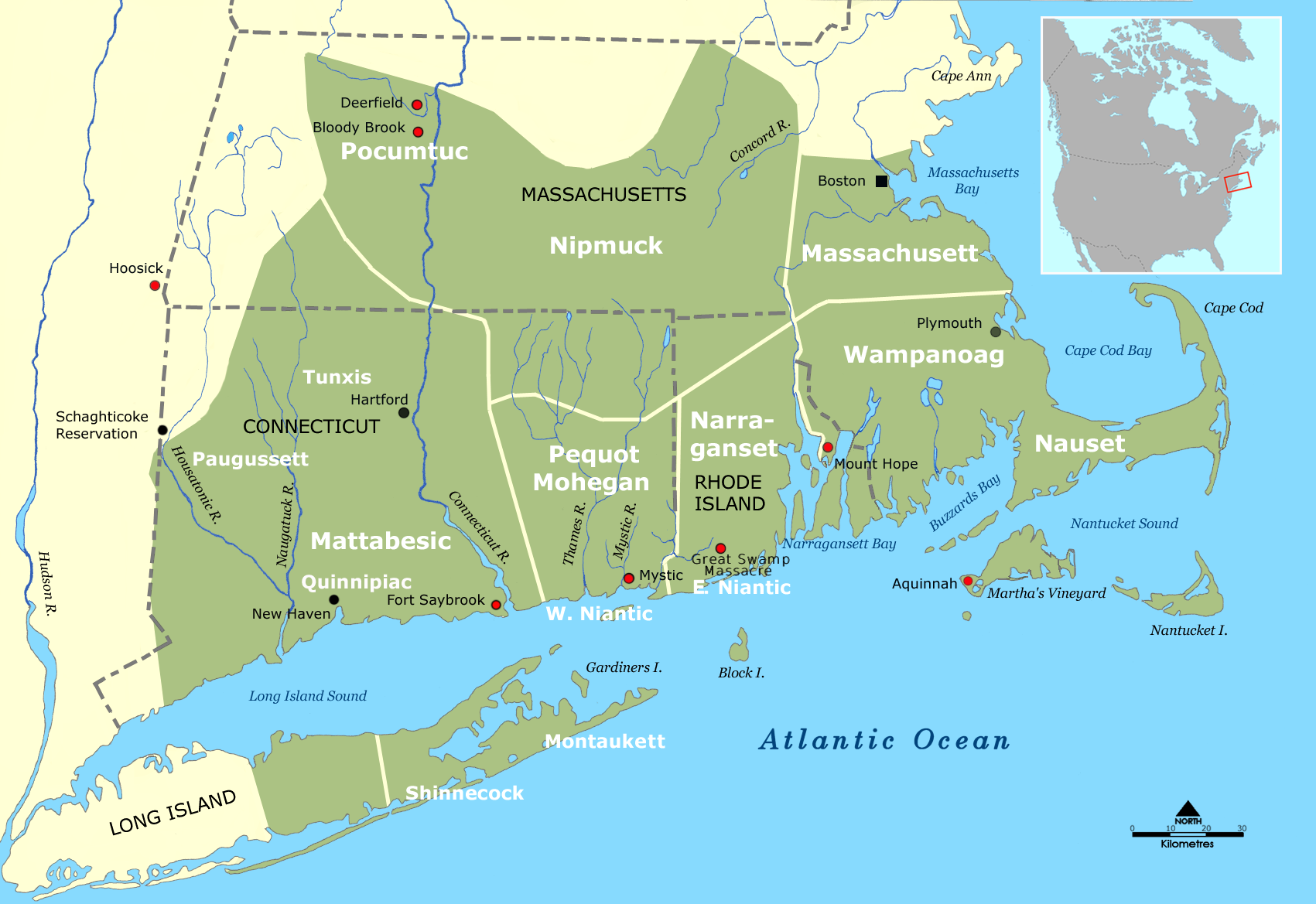
- Territories of Nauset and neighboring tribes

Total population
- Extinct as a tribe

Regions with significant populations
- United States (Massachusetts)

Languages
- an Eastern Algonquian language

Religion
- Indigenous religion

Related ethnic groups
- Other Algonquian peoples

The Nauset people, sometimes referred to as the Cape Cod Indians, were a Native American tribe who lived in Cape Cod, Massachusetts. They lived east of Bass River and lands occupied by their closely related neighbors, the Wampanoag.

Although the Nauset were a distinct tribe from the Wampanoag, they often deferred to the authority of the Wampanoag chief sachem, and shared with the Wampanoag many similar aspects of culture, agricultural practices, and a common tongue, the Massachusett language.

The tribe was one of the first to be visited by European explorers and colonists, who abducted some tribal members to sell into slavery in Spain and introduced diseases which reduced the Nauset population even before colonization of New England began on a large scale.

== Historical record ==
Samuel de Champlain describes contact with the Nauset people at Nauset Harbor in July of 1605. During this visit a member of the French expedition and several native people were killed in a dispute over a metal kettle.

The Pilgrims' first contact with the Nauset was during the Mayflower's landing in November, 1620 near present-day Provincetown, when they discovered a deserted village, the Nauset being away at their winter hunting grounds. Desperately low on supplies, the Pilgrims stole a cache of maize, though they left a note (in English) promising to pay for what they had stolen. The promise was eventually kept when the Nauset, led by Aspinet, returned months later. The Nauset also returned a small boy who had wandered away from the colony and become lost, an act which greatly improved relations with nearby colonists.

In subsequent years, the Nauset became the colonists' closest allies. Most became Christianized and aided the colonists as scouts and warriors against the Wampanoag during King Philip's War. Their numbers, always small, were further reduced. They intermarried with neighboring tribes and settlers after King Philip's War.

== Lifeways ==
Living along the Atlantic Ocean, the Nauset relied heavily on seafood, but also impressed European explorers with the productivity of their swidden agriculture based on the "three sisters" of maize, beans, squash, as well as Jerusalem artichokes, tobacco and silviculture of mast trees. They consumed maize boiled whole in earthen pots, or prepared a maize flour with mortar and pestle which was then made into corn cakes. During the autumn, they hunted wild turkey using bows and arrows tipped with the spines of horseshoe crabs and fletched with turkey feathers. They also armed themselves with clubs and spears for defense.

In the summer of 1605 when they were visited by Champlain, clothing consisted of leather loincloths for both men and women, at times grass or hemp dogbane tunics, and open-front skin wraps for women. Both genders decorated their skins with black, yellow, and red pigments, and plaited or twisted their hair, decorating it with shell beads. Men plucked their beards, and cut the hair on top of their head short, leaving the rest long.

== Legacy ==
- Nauset Regional High School is located in North Eastham, within the boundaries of the Cape Cod National Seashore, and serves students from Brewster, Orleans, Eastham, Wellfleet, Truro and surrounding towns.
- Nauset Regional Middle School is located in Orleans, and serves students from the same towns as the high school.
- Nauset Light in North Eastham.
  - Nauset Light Beach, adjacent to Nauset Light, is named after the lighthouse.
- Nauset Beach, Orleans

== See also ==
- Native American tribes in Massachusetts
