= List of independent bookstores in the United States =

This is a list of independent bookstores in the United States, both current and defunct, which have had physical ("brick-and-mortar") locations. For bookstores with at least 4 locations, see list of bookstore chains.

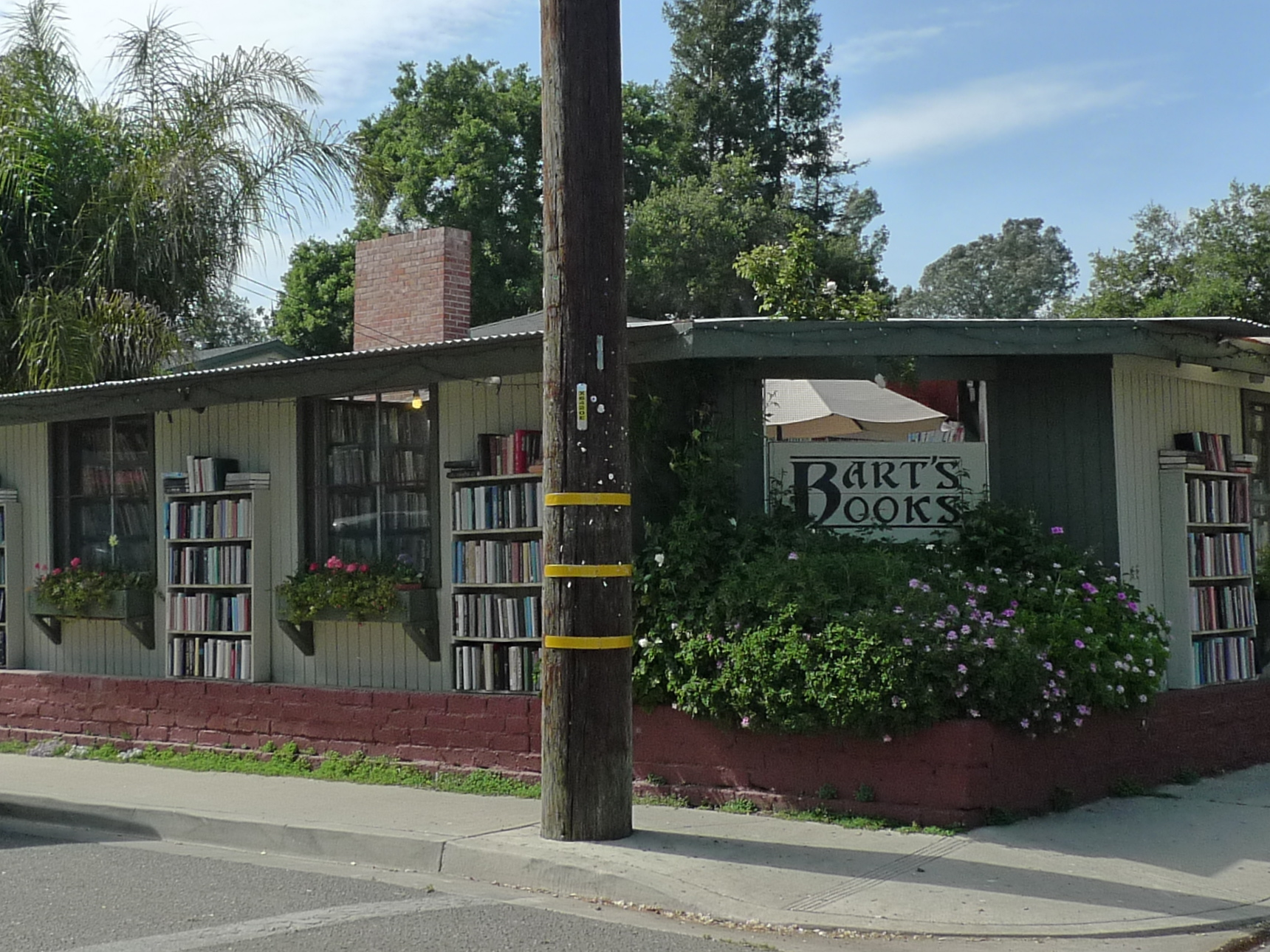
Bart's Books in Ojai

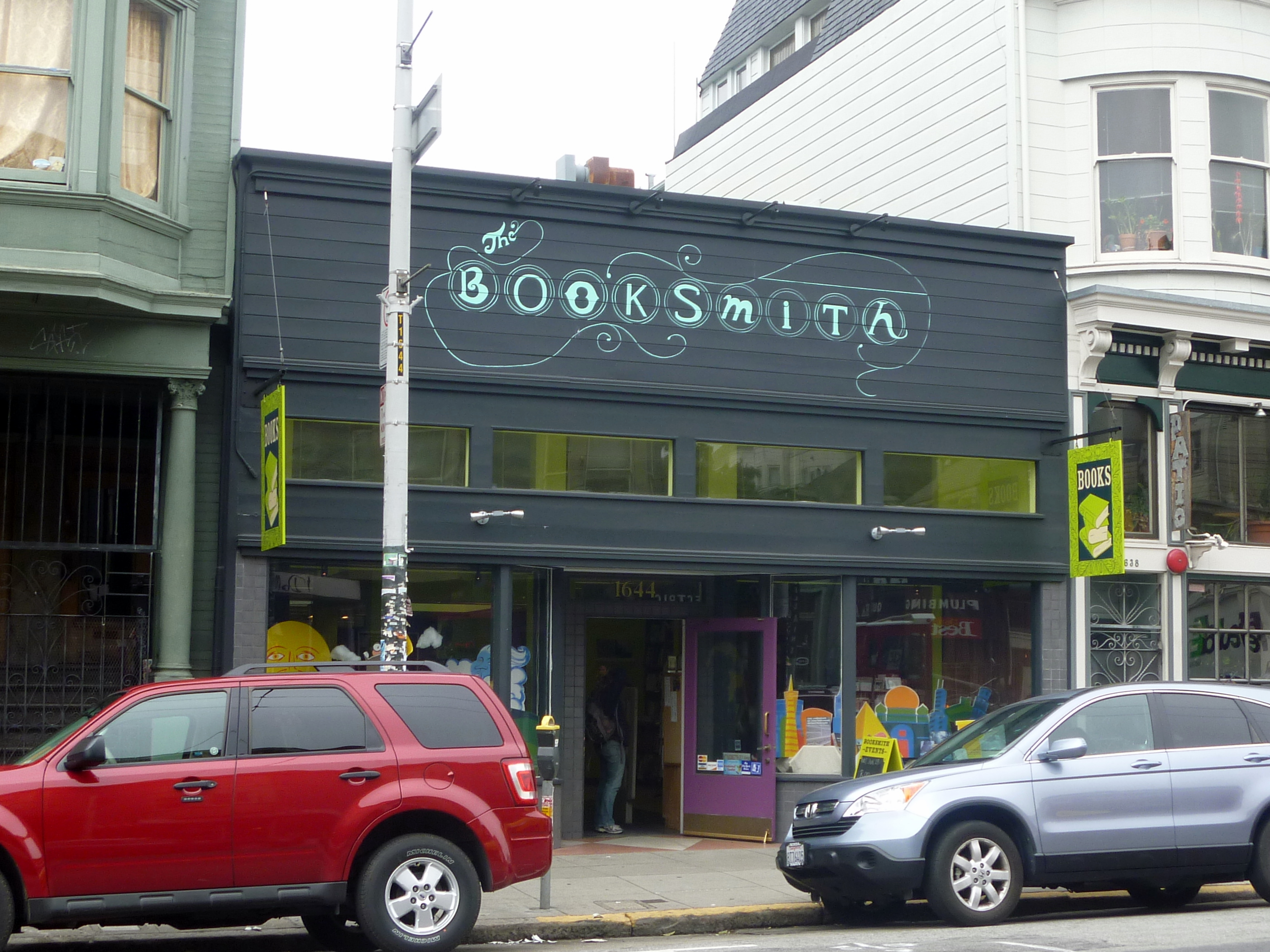
Booksmith, San Francisco

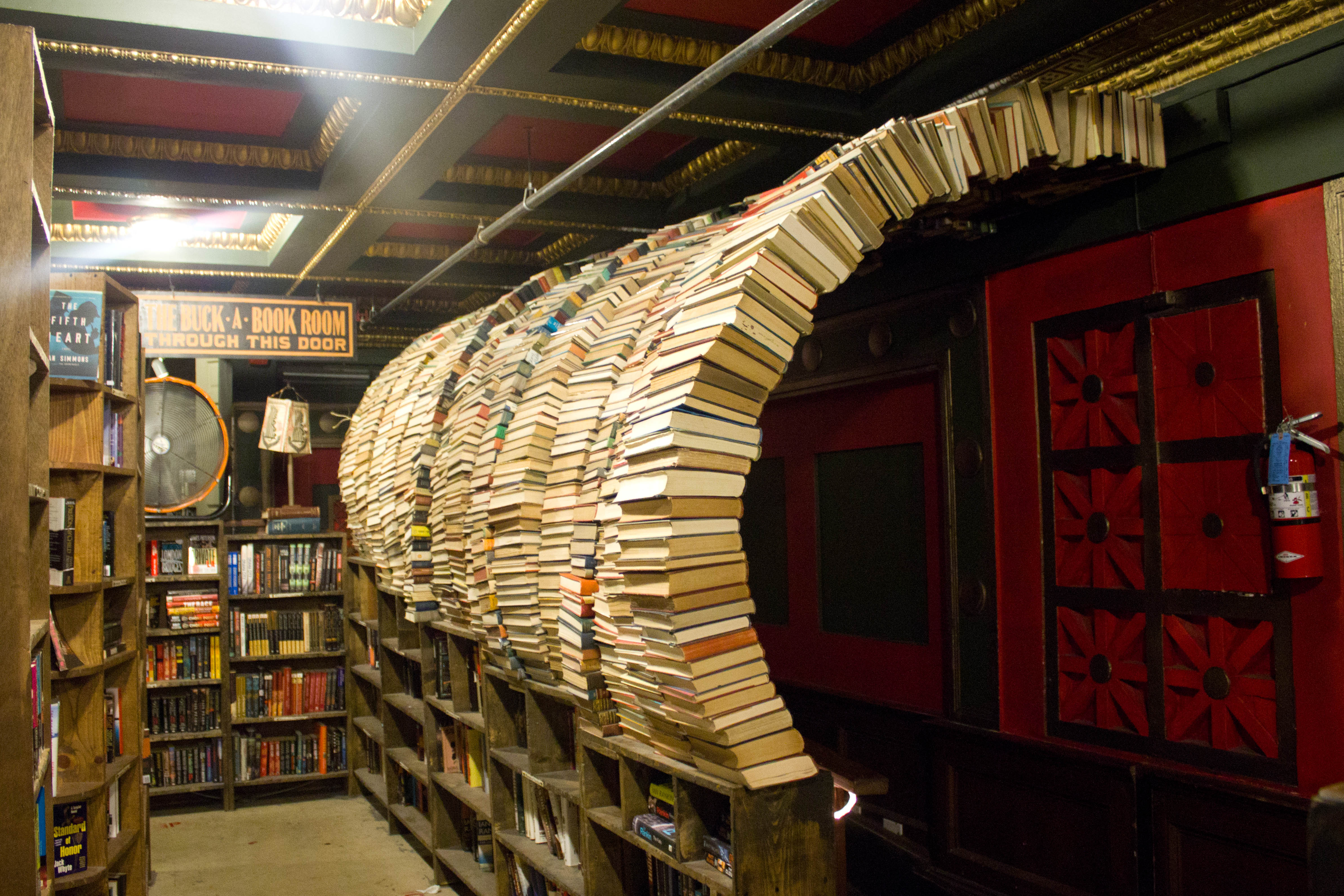
The Last Bookstore, Los Angeles

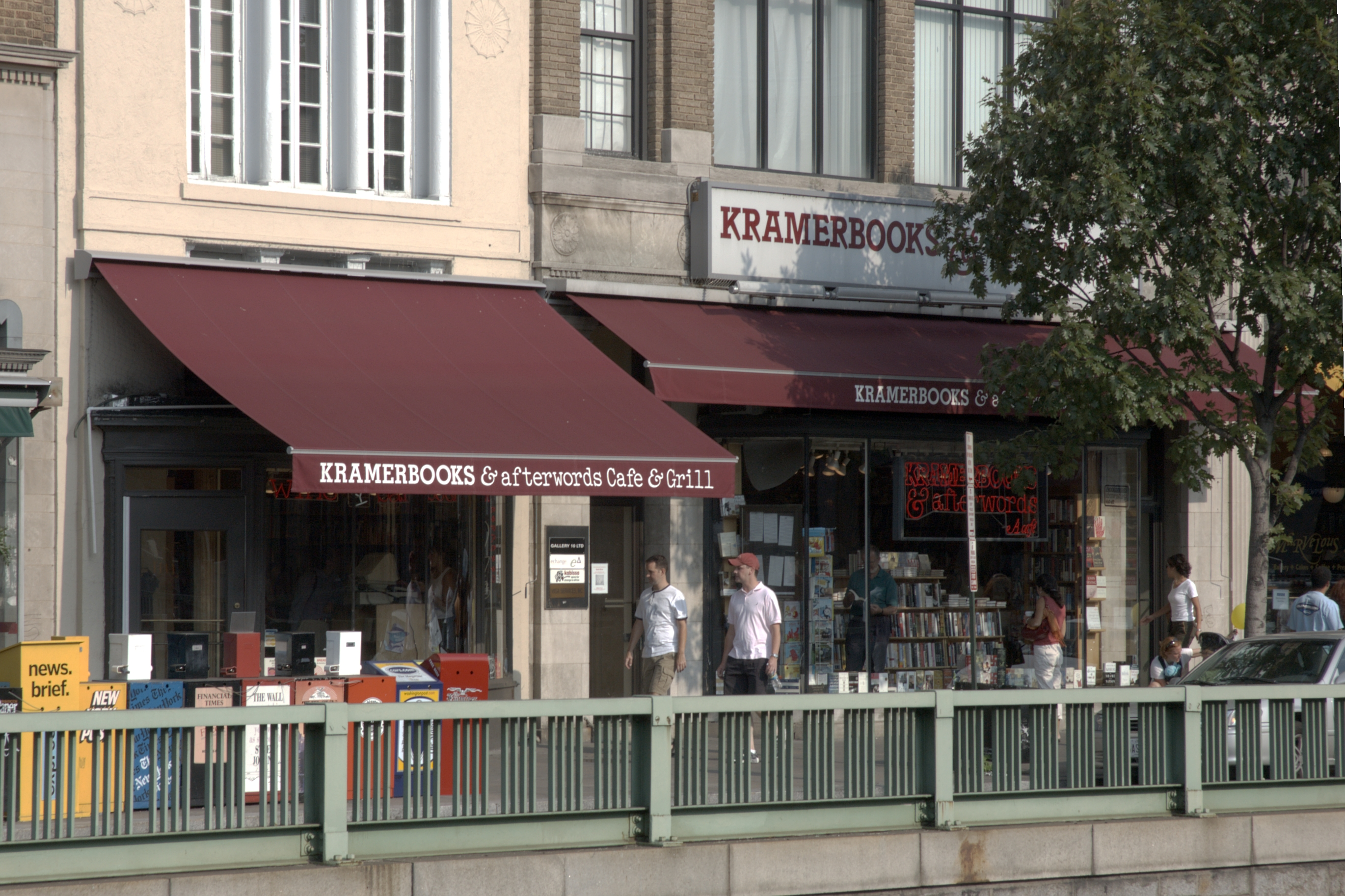
Kramers (bookstore)

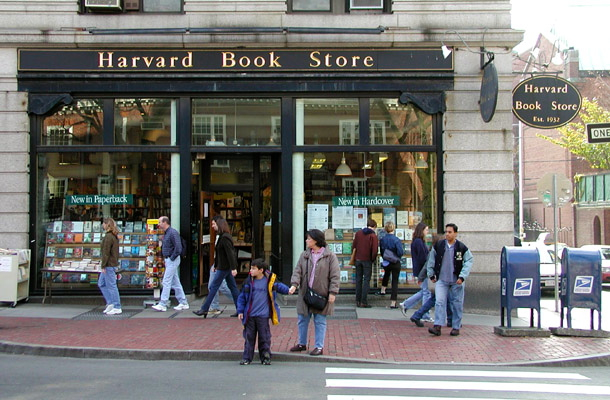
Harvard Book Store, Cambridge

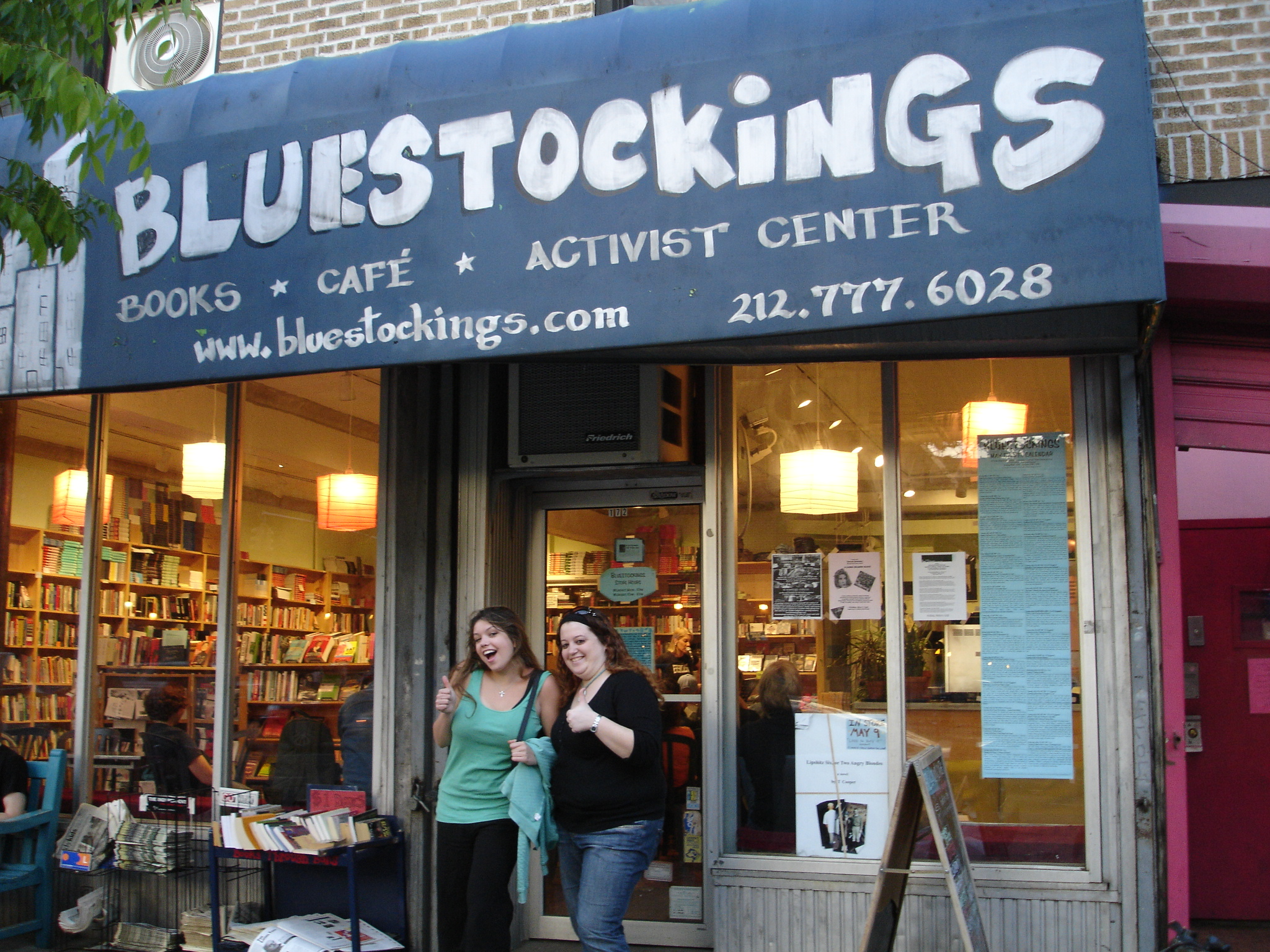
Bluestockings in Manhattan

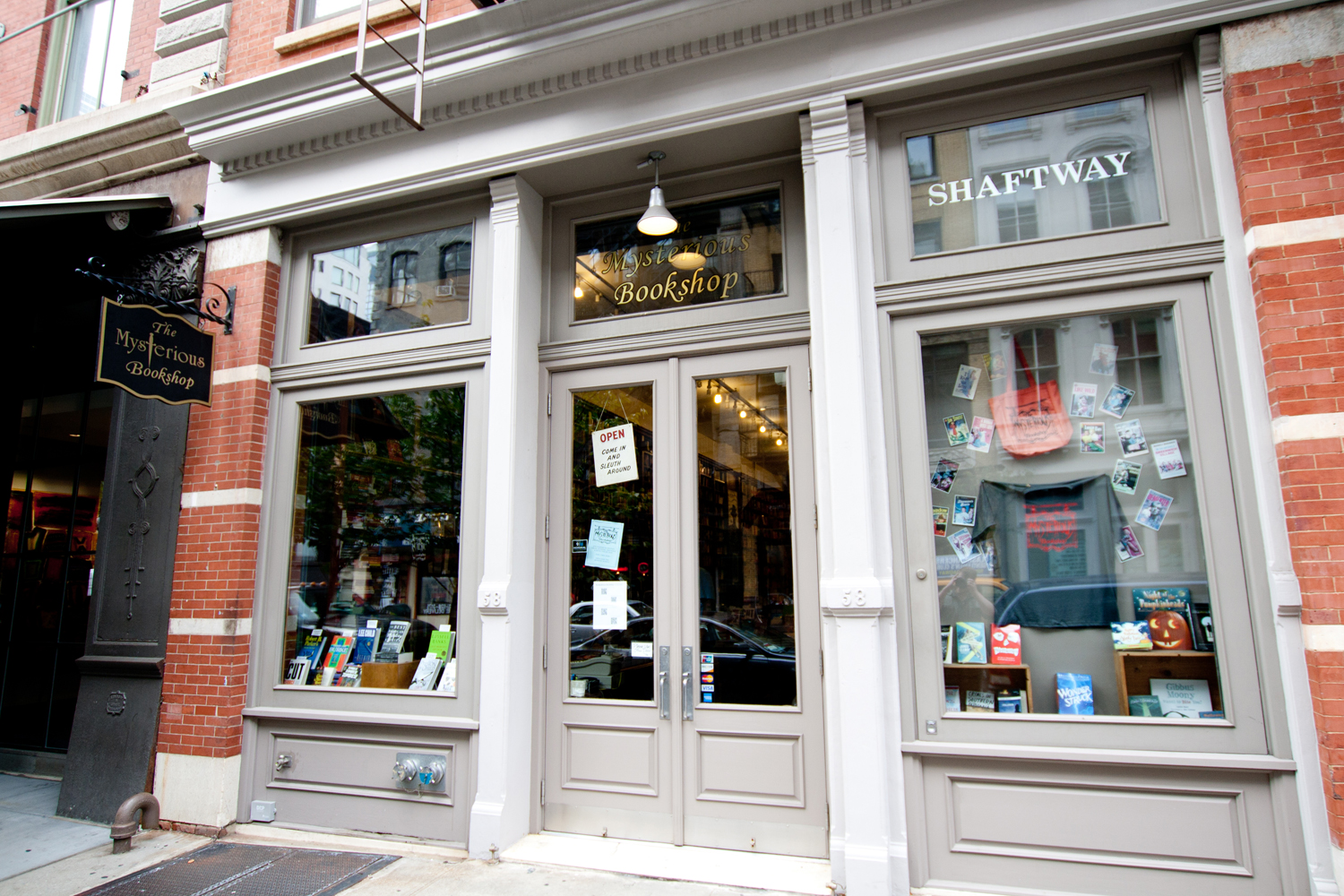
The Mysterious Bookshop, Manhattan

== Current ==
Name	State	Location(s)	Type
Grassrootz Bookstore	Arizona	Phoenix	African-American
Larry Edmunds Bookshop	California	Los Angeles	
The Last Bookstore	California	Los Angeles	
Tia Chucha's Centro Cultural	California	Los Angeles	
Kepler's Books	California	Menlo Park	
Bart's Books	California	Ojai	
Vroman's Bookstore	California	Pasadena	
Libélula Books & Co.	California	San Diego	
Mysterious Galaxy	California	San Diego and Redondo Beach	
Warwick's	California	San Diego	
Booksmith	California	San Francisco	
Borderlands Books	California	San Francisco	
Bound Together Anarchist Collective Bookstore	California	San Francisco	Anarchist
City Lights Bookstore	California	San Francisco	
Green Apple Books & Music	California	San Francisco	
Marcus Books	California	San Francisco (2 locations)	
Book Soup	California	West Hollywood	
Circus of Books	California	West Hollywood	LGBT
Mile High Comics	Colorado	Denver	
Bloodroot	Connecticut	Bridgeport	Feminist
R.J. Julia Booksellers	Connecticut	Madison	
JF Books	District of Columbia		
Kramers (bookstore)	District of Columbia		
MahoganyBooks	District of Columbia		
Politics and Prose	District of Columbia (3 locations)		
For Keeps (bookstore)	(Georgia (U.S. state)) Georgia	Atlanta	
Charis Books & More	(Georgia (U.S. state)) Georgia	Decatur	Feminist
Quimby's Bookstore	Illinois	Chicago	
Seminary Co-op	Illinois	Chicago	
Unabridged Bookstore	Illinois	Chicago	LGBT
Women & Children First	Illinois	Chicago	LGBT/Feminist
Prairie Lights	Iowa	Iowa City	
ACME Comics & Collectibles	Iowa	Sioux City	
Rainy Day Books	Kansas	Fairway	
Eighth Day Books	Kansas	Wichita	
Joseph-Beth Booksellers	Kentucky	Lexington	
Weiser Antiquarian Books	Maine	York	
Red Emma's Bookstore Coffeehouse	Maryland	Baltimore	Anarchist
Lucy Parsons Center	Massachusetts	Boston	Anarchist
Grolier Poetry Bookshop	Massachusetts	Cambridge	
Harvard Book Store	Massachusetts	Cambridge	
The Bookmill	Massachusetts	Montague	
The Odyssey Bookshop	Massachusetts	South Hadley	
That's Entertainment	Massachusetts	Worcester	
John K. King Books	Michigan	Detroit	
Birchbark Books	Minnesota	Minneapolis	
DreamHaven Books	Minnesota	Minneapolis	Sci-fi, fantasy, and horror
Mayday Books	Minnesota	Minneapolis	
Moon Palace Books	Minnesota	Minneapolis	
Mager's & Quinn	Minnesota	Minneapolis	
Black Garnet Books	Minnesota	Saint Paul	African-American
Square Books	Mississippi	Oxford	
Left Bank Books	Missouri	St. Louis	
Montana Valley Book Store	Montana	Alberton	
Gambler's Book Shop	Nevada	Las Vegas	
The Writer's Block	Nevada	Las Vegas	
The Lit. Bar	New York	The Bronx	
Book Thug Nation	New York	Brooklyn	
Books Are Magic	New York	Brooklyn (2 locations)	
Community Bookstore	New York	Brooklyn	
Greenlight Bookstore	New York	Brooklyn	
PowerHouse Books	New York	Brooklyn	
Spoonbill & Sugartown Books	New York	Brooklyn	
Troubled Sleep	New York	Brooklyn	
Unnameable Books	New York	Brooklyn	
Argosy Book Store	New York	Manhattan	
Albertine Books	New York	Manhattan	
Bluestockings	New York	Manhattan	Feminist
Books of Wonder	New York	Manhattan	
Housing Works Bookstore Cafe	New York	Manhattan	
Left Bank Books	New York	Manhattan	
McNally Jackson	New York	Manhattan/Brooklyn (5 locations)	
The Mysterious Bookshop	New York	Manhattan	
Printed Matter, Inc	New York	Manhattan	
Rizzoli Bookstore	New York	Manhattan	
Strand Bookstore	New York	Manhattan	
Womanbooks	New York	Manhattan	Feminist
Yu & Me Books	New York	Manhattan	
Astoria Bookshop	New York	Queens	
Firestorm Cafe & Books	North Carolina	Asheville	Anarchist/LGBT
Internationalist Books	North Carolina	Chapel Hill	
The Book Loft of German Village	Ohio	Columbus	
Two Dollar Radio Headquarters	Ohio	Columbus	
The Duck Store	Oregon	Eugene	
Powell's Books	Oregon	Portland	
Rose City Book Pub	Oregon	Portland	
Moravian Book Shop	Pennsylvania	Bethlehem	College
Baldwin's Book Barn	Pennsylvania	Philadelphia	
Giovanni's Room Bookstore	Pennsylvania	Philadelphia	LGBT
Hakim's Bookstore	Pennsylvania	Philadelphia	African-American
Wooden Shoe Books and Records	Pennsylvania	Philadelphia	Anarchist
City Books	Pennsylvania	Pittsburgh	
Otto Bookstore	Pennsylvania	Williamsport	
Hub City Bookshop	South Carolina	Spartanburg	
BookPeople	Texas	Austin	
Kindred Stories	Texas	Houston	African-American
Pariyatti	Washington	Onalaska	
Charlie's Queer Books	Washington	Seattle	LGBTQ
Chin Music Press	Washington	Seattle	
Elliott Bay Book Company	Washington	Seattle	
Fuel Coffee & Books	Washington	Seattle (3 locations)	
Third Place Books	Washington	Seattle (3 locations)	
Left Bank Books	Washington	Seattle	Anarchist
Queen Anne Book Company	Washington	Seattle	
University Book Store	Washington	Seattle	
Taylor Books	West Virginia	Charleston	
A Room of One's Own	Wisconsin	Madison	LGBT/Feminist
Renaissance Books	Wisconsin	Milwaukee	
Woodland Pattern Book Center	Wisconsin	Milwaukee	

== Historical ==
The following is a list of independent bookstores which no longer sell books at brick-and-mortar stores but did in the past.

Name	State	City	Years active	Type
Acres of Books	California	Long Beach	1934–2008	
Bodhi Tree Bookstore	California	Los Angeles (eventually West Hollywood)	1970–2011	
The Book Shop	California	Hayward	?–2017	
A Change of Hobbit	California	Southern California	1972–1991	Sci-fi, fantasy, and horror
Cody's Books	California	Berkeley	1956–2008	
Comics and Comix	California	Berkeley	1972–2004	
Computer Literacy Bookshops	California	Sunnyvale	1983–2000	
Daliel's Bookstore	California	Berkeley	1945–1952	
Dawson's Book Shop	California	Los Angeles	1905–?	
Dutton's Books	California	Valley Village (Los Angeles) and Burbank	1960–2006	
Eso Won Books	California	Los Angeles	1988–2022	African-American
Fahrenheit 451 Books	California	Laguna Beach	1968–1994	
A Different Light	California	Silver Lake (Los Angeles) and The Castro (San Francisco)	1979–2011	LGBT
John Cole's Book Shop	California	La Jolla (San Diego)	1946–2005	
Lobal Orning	California	Topanga	2003–2008	
Midnight Special Bookstore	California	Santa Monica	1970–2004	
Old Wives Tales	California	San Francisco	1976–1995	Feminist
The Other Change of Hobbit	California	Berkeley later in El Cerrito (now mail-order only)	1977–2014	Sci-fi, fantasy, and horror
Printers Inc. Bookstore	California	Palo Alto	1978–2001	
A Woman's Place	California	Oakland	1970–1989	Feminist
Brian MacKenzie Infoshop	District of Columbia		2003–2008	
Lambda Rising	District of Columbia		1974–2010	LGBT
Teaching for Change Bookstore	District of Columbia		?-2015	
Washington Bookshop	District of Columbia		1938–1950	
World Bank Infoshop	District of Columbia		1996–2016	
Haslam's Bookstore	Florida	St. Petersburg	1933–2020	
Open Books & Records	Florida	Miami Beach	1979–1994	
Kroch's and Brentano's	Illinois	Chicago	1954–1995	
New World Resource Center	Illinois	Chicago	?	
Prairie Avenue Bookshop	Illinois	Chicago	?–2009	
Better World Books	Indiana	Goshen and Mishawaka	2002–2019	
Boxcar Books	Indiana	Bloomington	2001–2017	
Iron Rail Book Collective	Louisiana	New Orleans	2003–2014	Anarchist
Greetings & Readings	Maryland	Hunt Valley	1969–2019	
Victor Kamkin Bookstore	Maryland	Rockville	1953–2002	
Globe Corner Bookstore	Massachusetts	Cambridge	1982–2010	
New Words Bookstore	Massachusetts	Cambridge	1974–2008	
Schoenhof's Foreign Books	Massachusetts	Cambridge	1856–2017	
Marwil Bookstore	Michigan	Detroit	1948–2013	
Amazon Bookstore Cooperative	Minnesota	Minneapolis	1970–2012	LGBT/Feminist
Common Good Books	Minnesota	Saint Paul	2006–2019	
Coliseum Books	New York	Manhattan	1974–2007	
Community Bookstore	New York	Cobble Hill, Brooklyn	1974–2016	
A Different Light	New York	Manhattan	1979–2011	LGBT
Forbidden Planet	New York	Manhattan		Sci-fi, fantasy, and horror
Gotham Book Mart	New York	Manhattan	1920–2007	
J. Levine Books and Judaica	New York	Manhattan	1905–2019	
Librairie de France	New York	Manhattan	1935–2009	
Nkiru Books	New York	Brooklyn	1976–?	
Oscar Wilde Bookshop	New York	Manhattan	1967–2009	LGBT
Pomander Book Shop	New York	Manhattan	1975–1990s	
St. Mark's Bookshop	New York	Manhattan	1977–2016	
The Wooster Book Company	Ohio	Wooster	1992–2017	
Cameron's Books and Magazines	Oregon	Portland	1938–2021	
In Other Words Women's Books and Resources	Oregon	Portland	1993–2018	Feminist
Leary's Book Store	Pennsylvania	Philadelphia	1836–1969	
Beauty and the Book	Texas	Jefferson	?	

== See also ==
- American Booksellers Association
- Books in the United States
- List of bookstore chains
- List of independent bookstores
