= Bridge Street Books =

Bookstore in Washington, D.C., United States

Coordinates: 38.90492°N 77.05760°W

- Interactive map of the Bridge Street Books area

General information
- Status: Active
- Type: Retail
- Location: Georgetown, Washington, D.C., United States
- Current tenants: Bridge Street Books
- Affiliation: Independent bookstore

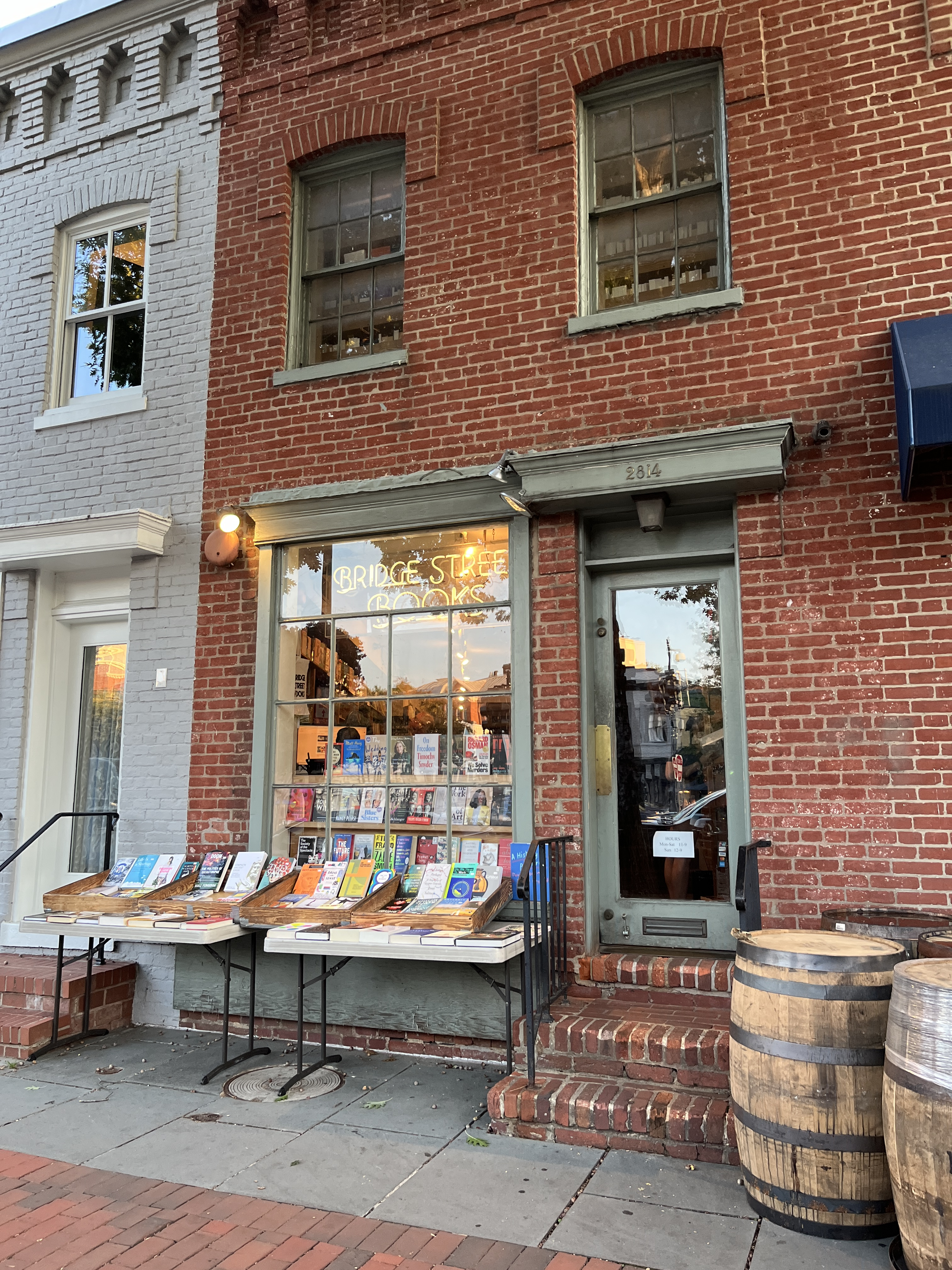
The shop's exterior in 2024

Bridge Street Books is an independent bookstore in Georgetown, Washington, D.C., United States. It was established in 1980.

== Description ==
The independent bookstore Bridge Street Books operates in Georgetown, Washington, D.C. The exterior has a neon sign. The interior has artwork and photographs of the Chesterfield Nationals. The shop has books about cultural studies, philosophy, poetry, and politics. Washingtonian has described the shop as "a collection spilling out onto the sidewalk." Fodor's has called the shop "charming". Another guide book says the shop has a "lovely ambiance".

== History ==
The shop was established by Philip Levy in 1980. He died in 2017.

== Reception ==
In 2015, writers for Washingtonian said: "Upon walking into this old Georgetown hole-in-the-wall, you're greeted by overflowing shelves of books shoved into a tiny space. It feels like someone's apartment, and there's not much room to move around. But if you can score some elbow room, Bridge Street is a great place to browse, especially if you're an avid devourer of history, religion and philosophy works. There's not much literature, but there is a pretty impressive shelf full of literary criticism." Emily Martin included Bridge Street Books in the magazine's 2019 list of five local bookstores with humorous Twitter accounts.

== See also ==
- List of independent bookstores in the United States
