= Mother Foucault's Bookshop =

Bookshop in Portland, Oregon, U.S.

Coordinates: 45.5176°N 122.6609°W

- Logo

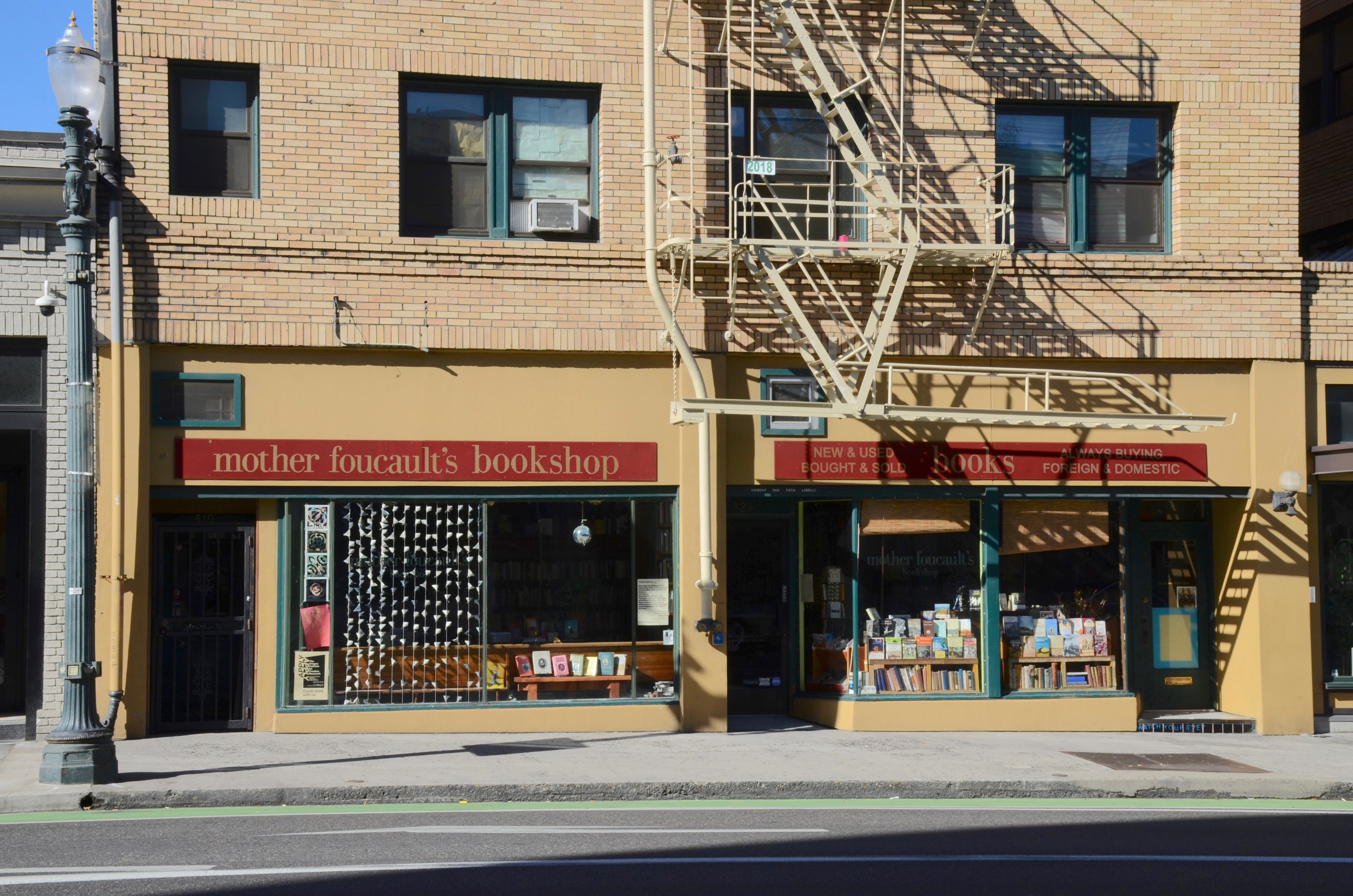
- Exterior of the bookshop on Southeast Morrison Street in 2018
- Headquarters: Portland, Oregon, United States

Mother Foucault's Bookshop is an independent bookstore in Portland, Oregon's Buckman neighborhood, in the United States. Craig Florence is the owner.

The business was established in 2011. It originally operated on Southeast Morrison Street. It later relocated to Grand Avenue. The interior has a antiques, artwork, a fake fireplace, and Persian carpets. There is also a bar, a catwalk, a stage, and a piano. The shop has hosted poetry readings and other activities, such as a zine release party.

Following a fundraising effort, the business purchased the building in which it operates in 2026.

== See also ==
- List of independent bookstores in the United States
