= Eagle Harbor Book Co. =

Independent bookstore on Bainbridge Island, Washington, U.S.

Coordinates: 47°37′29″N 122°31′13″W

- Logo
- Interactive map of the Eagle Harbor Book Co. area

General information
- Status: Active
- Type: Retail
- Location: Winslow Way E, Bainbridge Island, Washington, United States
- Current tenants: Eagle Harbor Book Co.
- Owner: Dave and Jane Danielson (since 2016)
- Affiliation: Independent bookstore

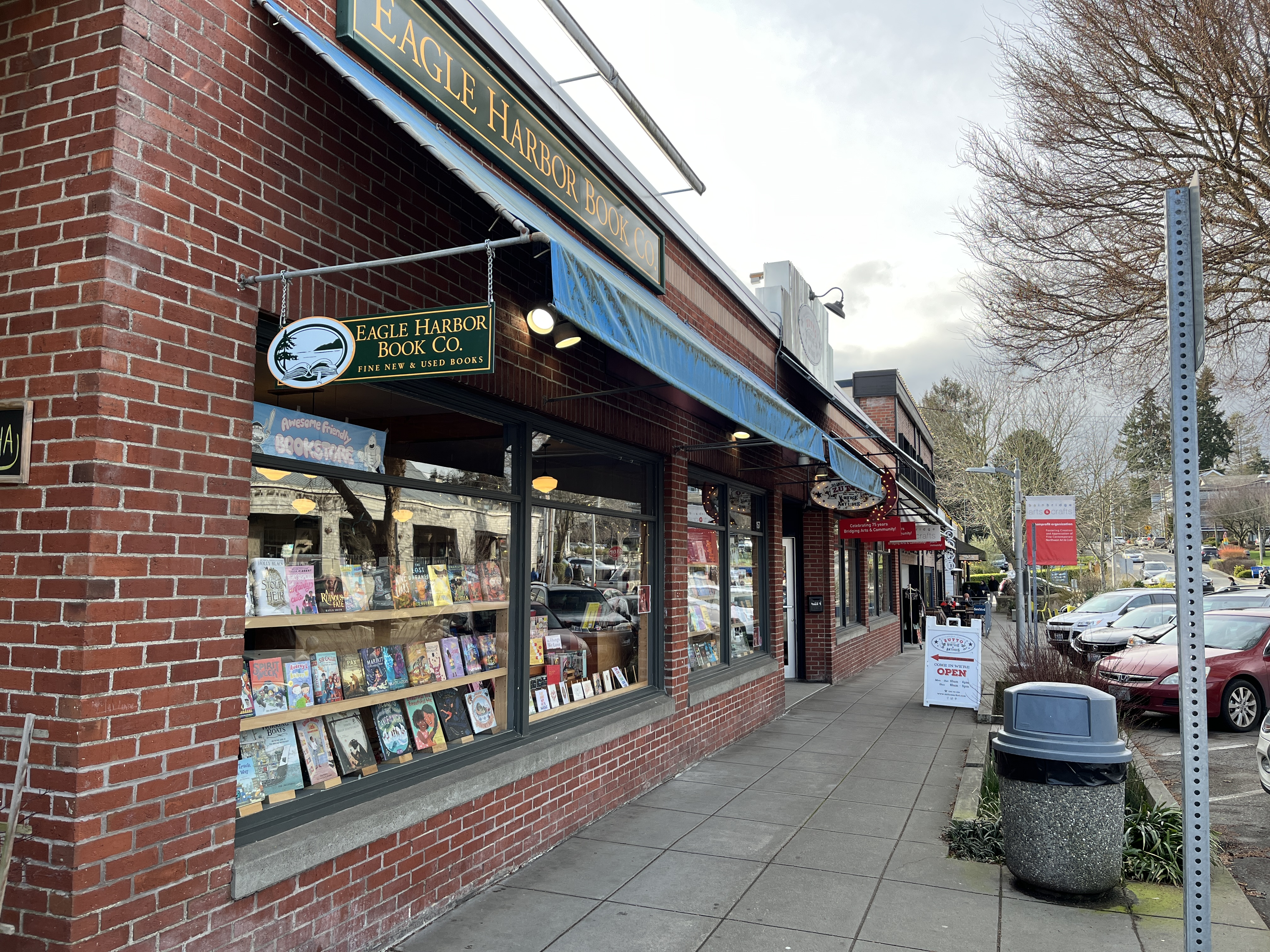
The shop's exterior, 2023

Eagle Harbor Book Co. is an independent bookstore on Bainbridge Island, Washington, United States.

== History ==
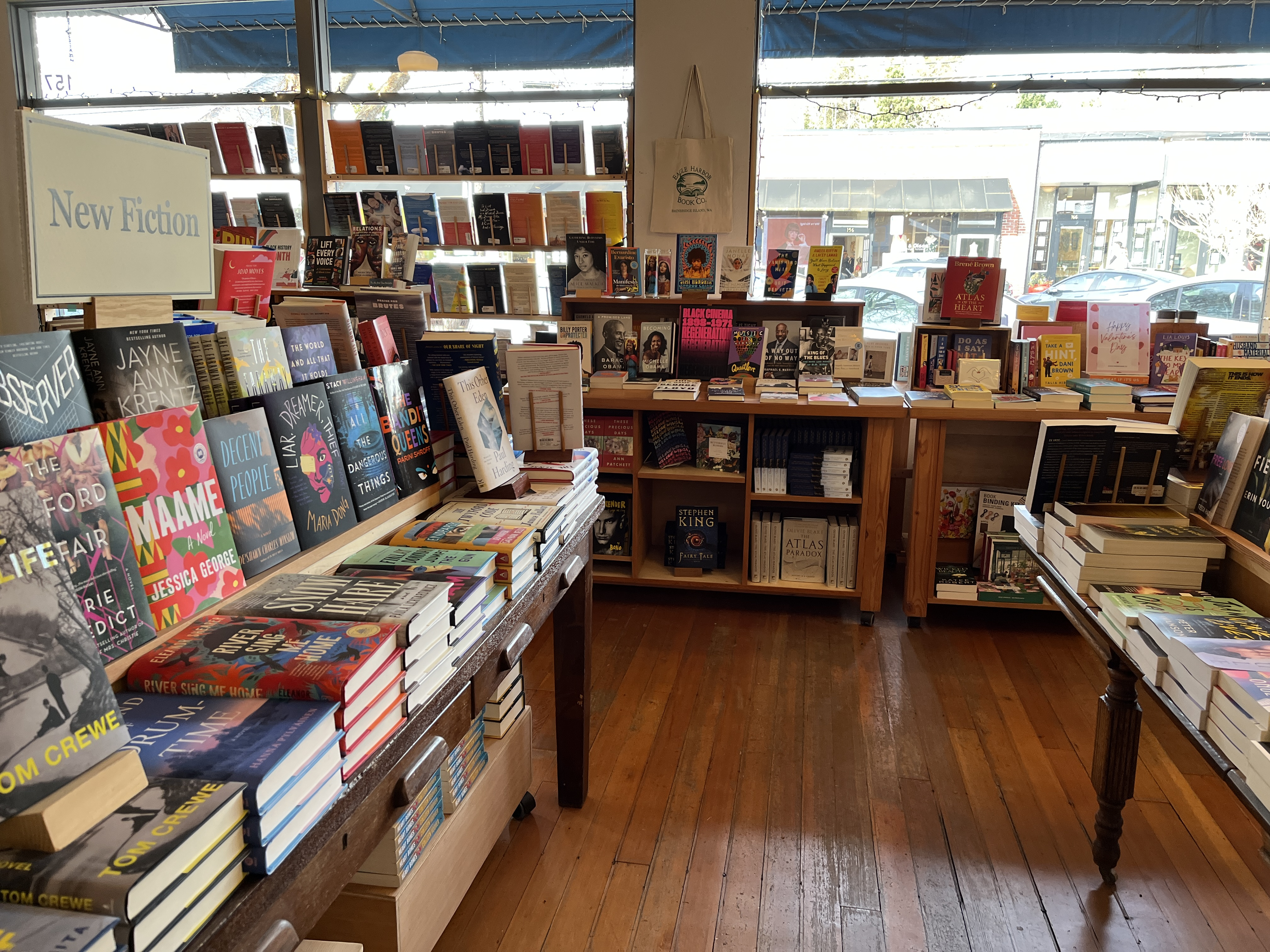
Interior in 2023

Morley Horder purchased the business in 1997. Tim Hunter and René Kirkpatrick joined as business partners in 2012.

In 2016, Dave and Jane Danielson purchased the store from Horder, Hunter, and Kirkpatrick.

== See also ==
- List of independent bookstores in the United States
