= Libélula Books & Co. =

Bookstore in San Diego, California, U.S.

Coordinates: 32.6960°N 117.1381°W

- Industry: Books
- Founded: 2021
- Founder: Jesi Gutierrez, Celi Hernandez
- Headquarters: San Diego, United States
- Products: New and used books
- Owner: Jesi Gutierrez, Celi Hernandez
- Website: https://www.libelulabooksandco.com/

Libélula Books & Co. is a queer, BIPOC-owned independent bookstore located in Barrio Logan in San Diego, California.

== Overview ==
Libélula Books & Co. was founded in June 2021 by Jesi Gutierrez and Celi Hernandez. It is located in a 700-square-foot space at South 26th St. in the historically Mexican-American neighborhood of Barrio Logan in San Diego. The bookstore holds a selection of art publications, poetry, LBGTQ literature, graphic novels, feminist literature, social justice-driven nonfiction, Spanish and English works, with an emphasis on indigenous, Black and Chicana/o history and narratives. The selection at Libélula is meant to uplift narratives of several historically marginalized identities such as women or femme, BIPOC, and/or LGBTQ. The bookstore also carries books by small press houses, self-published magazines by local writers, and new or used publications.

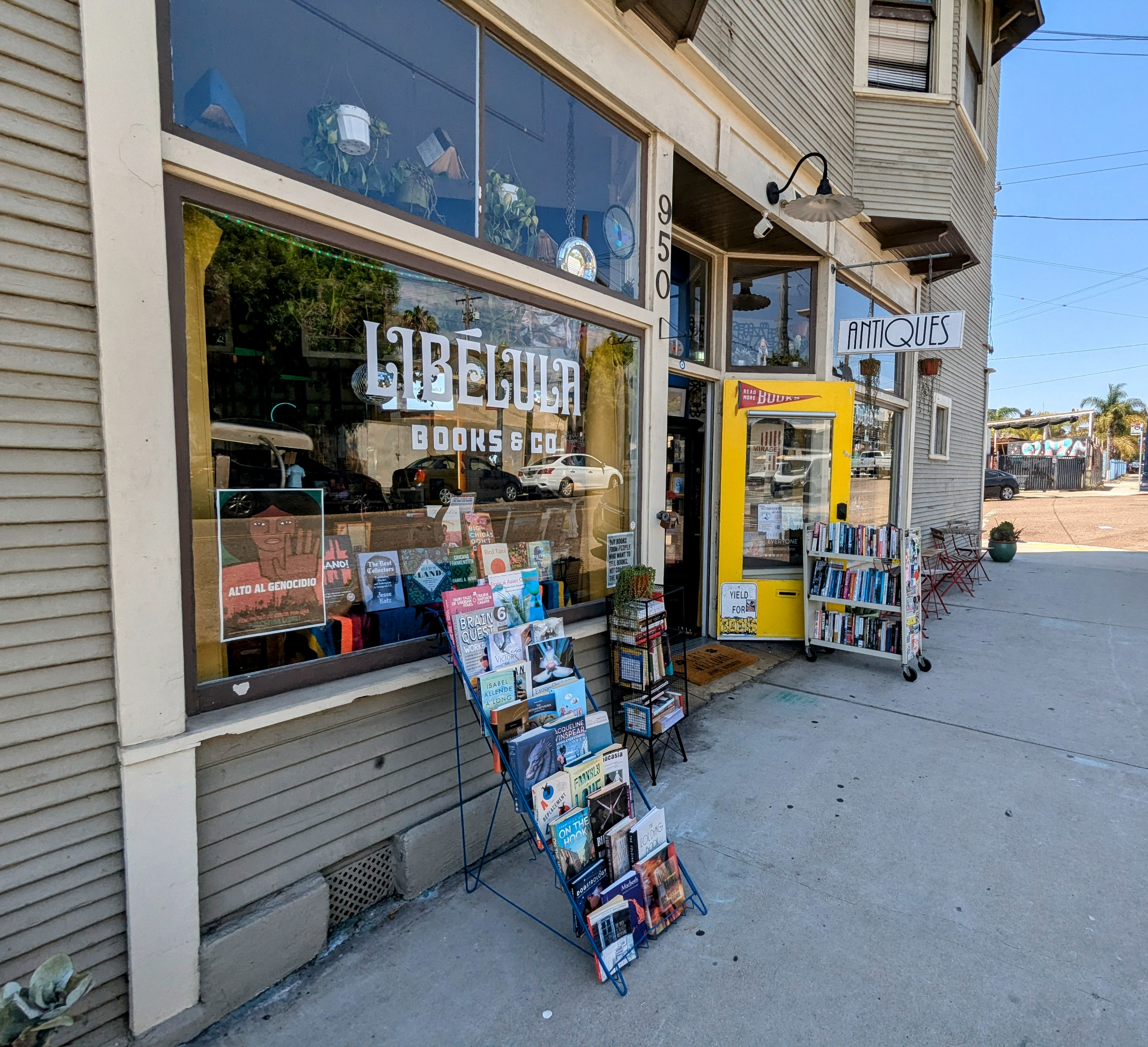
Libélula Books & Co. store front, 2024

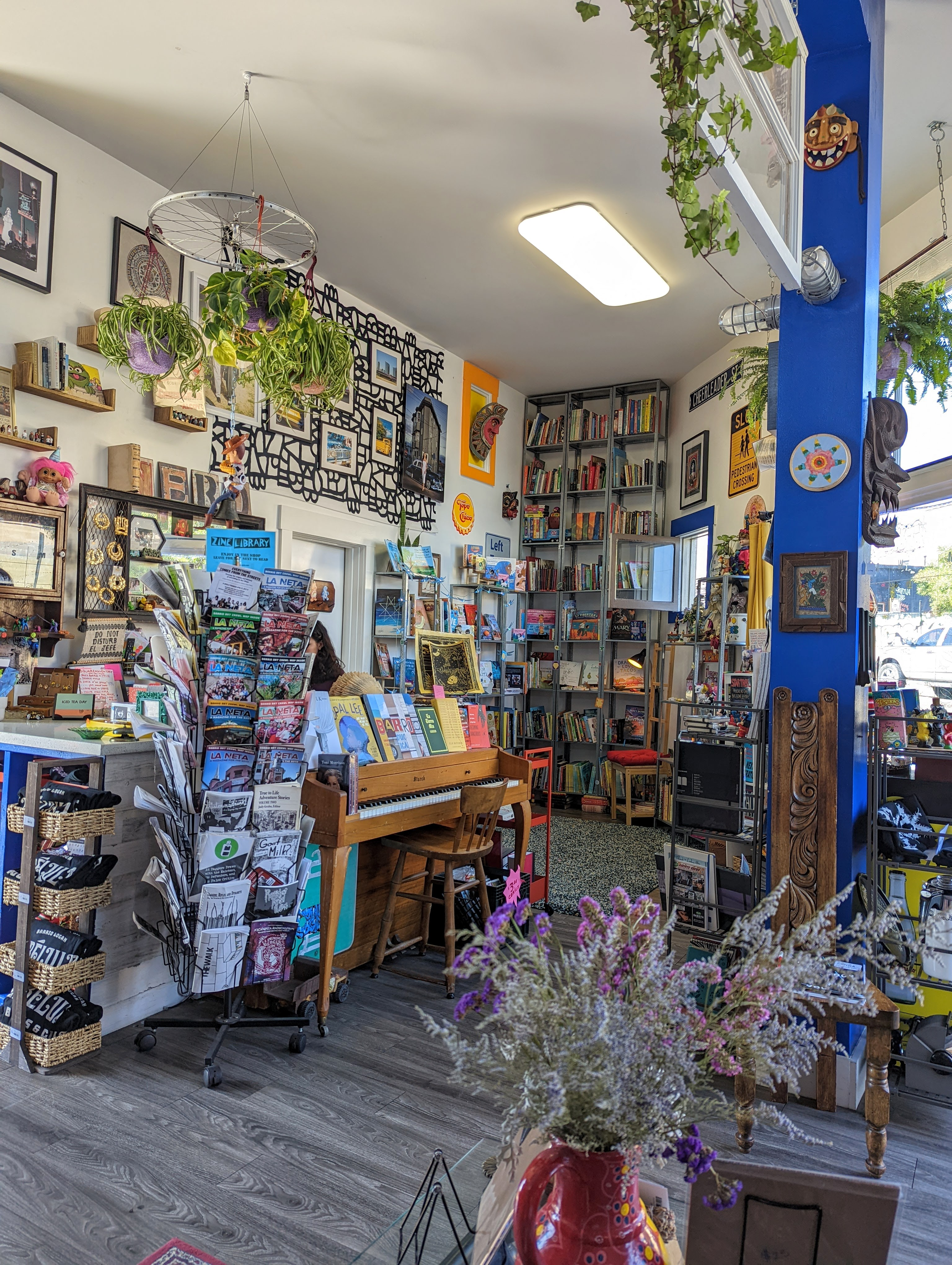
Interior of Libélula Books & Co. in June 2022.

According to the Los Angeles Times, the bookstore is a community centered space, intentionally curated to be a safe space for queer communities and communities of color. They offer free WiFi and a computer for the community's use. They are also in collaboration with the San Diego Brown Beret National Organization to offer free tutoring to youth of the community. Additionally, the space is used for screenings, readings, panels, art installations and other projects from local artists and authors. Guest artists that have been featured in the space include: Beatrice Zamora, Bob Dominguez, Polaris Castillo, Matt Sedillo.
