= Kindred Stories =

American independent bookstore

- Type: Independent bookstore
- Founded: 2021; 5 years ago
- Founder: Terri Hamm
- Headquarters: 2310 Elgin St #2, Houston, TX 77004
- Website: kindredstorieshtx.com

Kindred Stories is a bookstore and community space in Houston, Texas that specializes in contemporary and classic Black literature. Founded as an online bookstore in 2021 by Terri Hamm, its physical location opened in September of the same year in partnership with Project Row Houses in Houston’s historic Third Ward.

== History ==
Terri Hamm was inspired to start Kindred Stories by both her own experience as a young reader, and a shared love of reading with her daughter, to make Black literature more accessible to Black people, especially children and young adults. Her daughter was interested in books about Black girlhood, and Hamm realized she did not have access to a space in Houston to discover books by Black authors.

== Inventory and programs ==
Kindred Stories carries a wide variety of fiction and nonfiction books by Black and POC authors that span a number of genres, including classic literature, feminist and queer stories, sci-fi, speculative fiction, the arts, self-help and cookbooks.

The store is also known for its community events, hosting regular programs that include monthly book clubs, author talks, and workshops. Beginning as a series of pop-up events, Kindred Stories often collaborates with Houston-based Black writers, artists, cultural workers and institutions in their community programming.

== See also ==
- List of independent bookstores in the United States
- Third Ward, Houston
- Project Row Houses
