= Two Dollar Radio Headquarters =

- Interactive map of Two Dollar Radio Headquarters

Restaurant information
- Established: September 2017
- Chef: Eric Obenauf
- Food type: vegan food
- Location: 1124 Parsons Ave, Columbus, Ohio, 43206, United States
- Coordinates: 39.940623°N 82.982910°W
- Website: twodollarradiohq.com

Two Dollar Radio Headquarters (HQ) is an independent bookstore, performance and event space, bar, coffeehouse, and a counter-service vegan café located in the South Side neighborhood of Ganthers Place within Thurman Square in Columbus, Ohio. It opened in September 2017 and is locally owned and operated by Eric Obenauf — publisher of the indie press also based in Columbus, Ohio, — and Brett Gregory, with Eliza Wood-Obenauf. The bookstore carries a curated selection of independently published literature, as well as their own Two Dollar Radio books.

The venue hosts live cultural events such as author readings, reading series, film screenings, comedy nights, slam poetry open mics, and music from DJs, touring and local bands, and chamber music from local group Chamber Brews.

== See also ==
- List of vegetarian and vegan restaurants
- List of independent bookstores in the United States
