= Unnameable Books =

Independent book store in Brooklyn, New York

Coordinates: 40°40′44.0″N 73°58′5.6″W

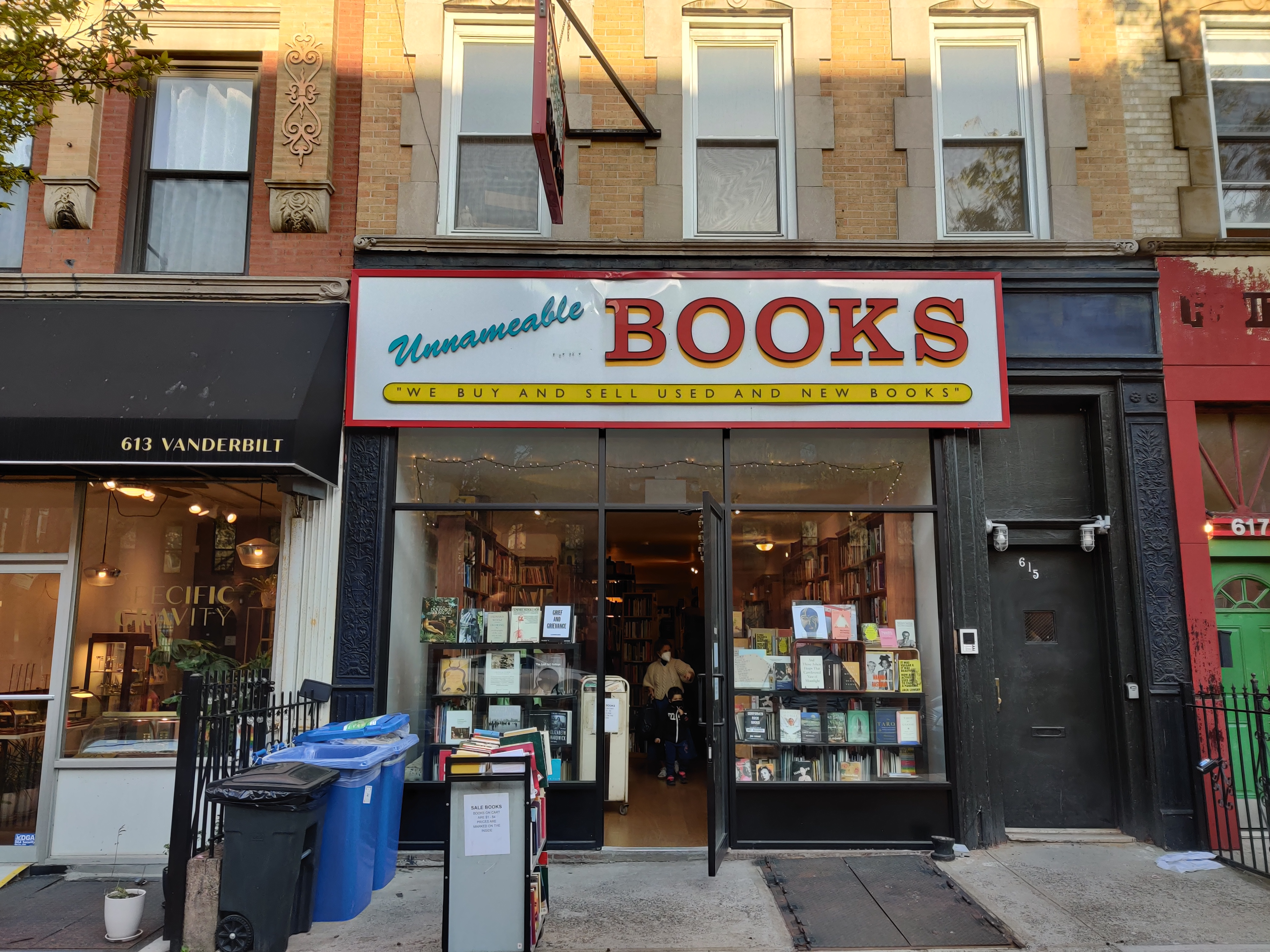
The exterior of the bookstore

Unnameable Books is an independent bookstore located on Vanderbilt Ave, between St. Marks Ave. and Bergen St., in Prospect Heights, Brooklyn, New York.

== Overview ==
Unnameable Books has been profiled as an example of a small New York bookstore that survives as chains, internet sales, and rising real estate prices drive more established New York independents like Coliseum Books and Murder Ink out of business. It was depicted on the cover of the June 9 and 16, 2008, issue of The New Yorker by the cartoonist Adrian Tomine as well as on a 2024 list of The New Yorker writers' and editors' favorite bookstores in New York City. Founded as "Adam's Books" before being renamed, it has an eclectic collection of fiction, nonfiction, and poetry used and new books. It also carries work from small independent presses, such as Ugly Duckling Presse. In 2022, the bookstore moved to a location across Vanderbilt Avenue and block away.
