= Queen Anne Book Company =

Bookstore in Seattle, Washington, U.S.

Coordinates: 47.6351°N 122.3572°W

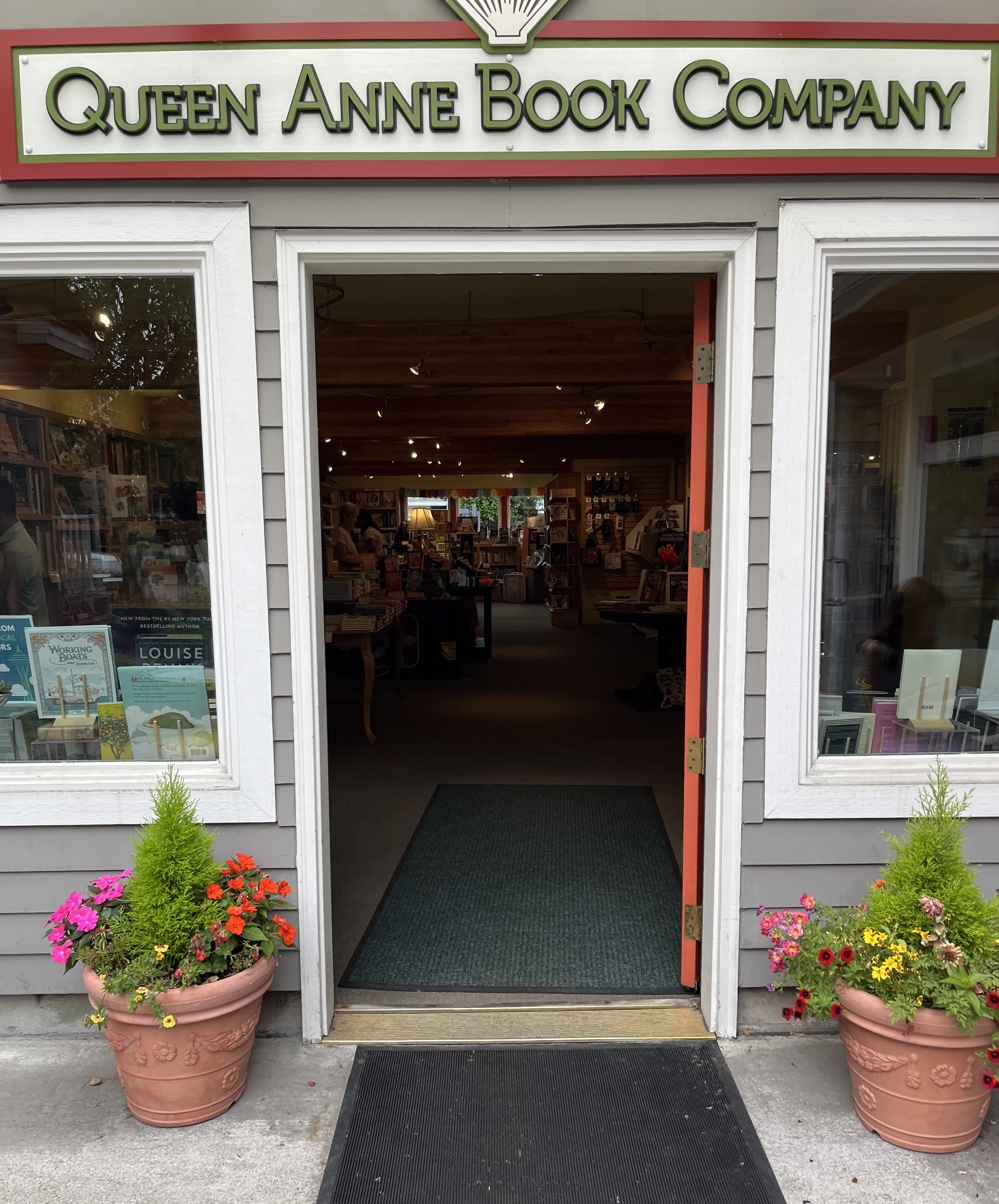
- The shop's entrance, 2024
- Company type: Private
- Industry: Retail
- Founded: March 1, 2013; 12 years ago in Queen Anne, Seattle, Washington, United States
- Founders: Judy and Krijn de Jonge, Janis Segress
- Headquarters: Seattle, United States
- Products: Books
- Website: qabookco.com

Queen Anne Book Company is an independent bookstore in Seattle, Washington, United States. The shop has a large collection of contemporary and children's literature.

== Description ==
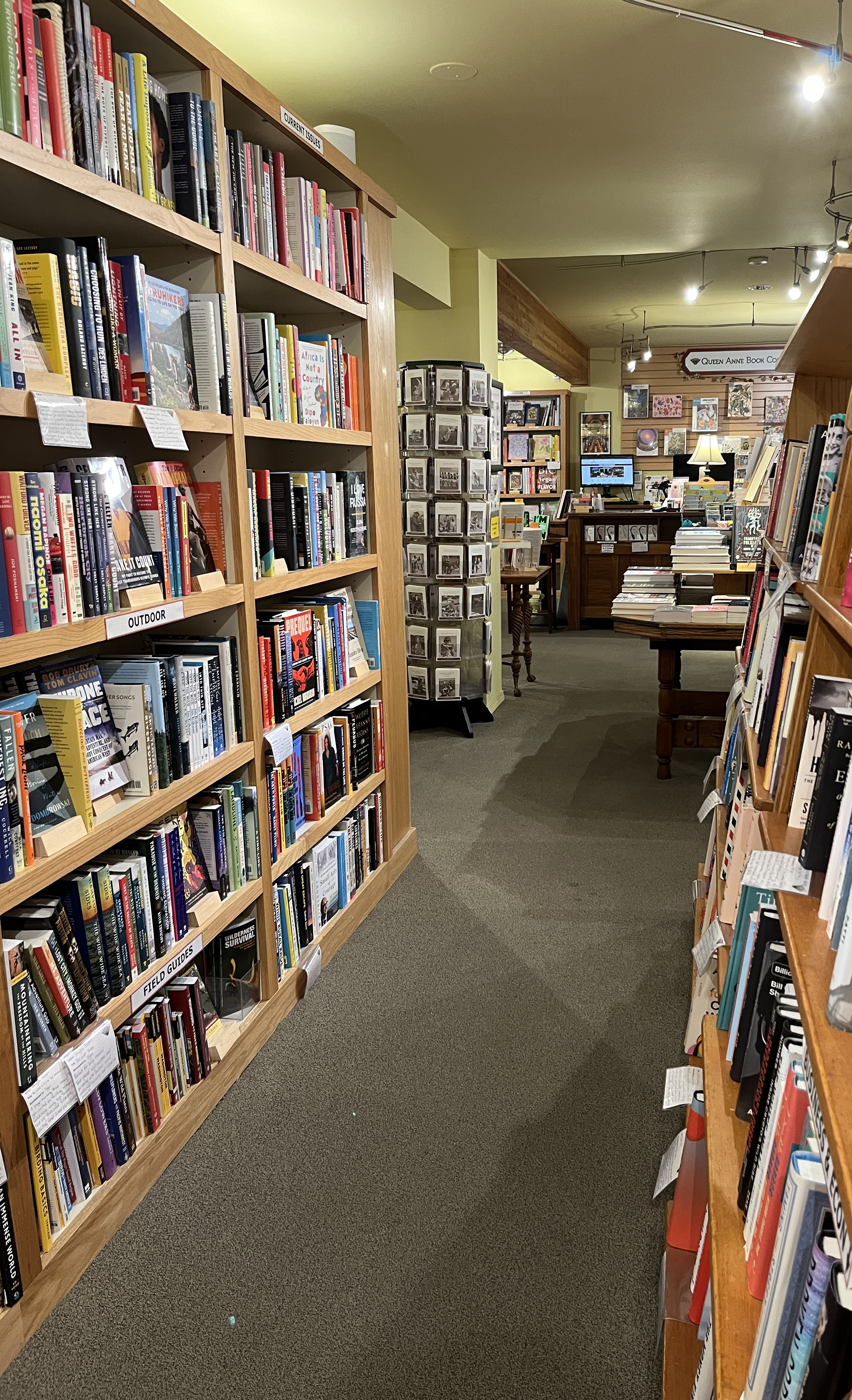
Interior in 2024

The independent book shop Queen Anne Book Company operates in Seattle's Queen Anne neighborhood. It is adjacent to Queen Anne Coffee Company, and previously El Diablo Coffee Co.

The Seattle Times has said: "The top of Queen Anne Hill is almost like an island apart from the rest of the city, and that's why Queen Anne Book Company feels a little like an island bookstore, stocked with all the escapist novels and dreamy cookbooks that you could ever hope for. The kid's book section is especially well-stocked, and the book club section offers plenty of possibilities for readers in search of inspiration."

== History ==
The shop is owned by Judy and Krijn de Jonge and Janis Segress. It has been a sponsor of Queen Anne Little League.

== See also ==
- List of independent bookstores in the United States
