= Book Thug Nation =

Bookstore in Brooklyn, New York

General information
- Location: 100 North 3rd Street; Brooklyn, NY 11249
- Coordinates: 40.7168°N 73.9619°W

Book Thug Nation was a Brooklyn independent bookstore in Williamsburg. Founded in 2009, it sold used books, primarily fiction, and occasionally hosted events ranging from book readings to film screenings. It closed in 2025.

== History ==
Book Thug Nation was founded in Williamsburg by four local booksellers in 2009, a year when numerous other bookstores appeared in Brooklyn; visual artist Robin Treadwell joined as manager for two years. It was the first of many bookstores that the four founded, with later bookstores being Codex Books, Troubled Sleep, Human Relations, and others.

== In the media ==
Book Thug Nation has been featured in articles by Publishers Weekly and others. CBS included it in a list of the five best used bookstores in New York City, as well as a list of the best independent bookstores in Brooklyn. Dazed called it one of the best book/zine stores in the city. The Eye of Photography placed it on a list of the best independent bookstores in the city. Brooklyn Reader ranked it second in a list of the best bookstores in Brooklyn. Musician Craig Finn, in The New York Times, named it as one of the bookstores he frequented in Williamsburg.

Ben Sisto, an artist, created an exhibit called Used Books at the Good Works Gallery in Brooklyn using books bought from Book Thug Nation and other bookstores. One of his works, "Interaction of Interaction of Color", was conceived after Sisto bought Interaction of Color by Josef Albers from Book Thug Nation.
