= Lobal Orning =

Former record and book store in Topanga, California, USA

Coordinates: 34.0898°N 118.6038°W

- Company type: Privately held company
- Industry: Retailing
- Founded: 2003
- Defunct: March 1st, 2008
- Headquarters: Topanga, California
- Key people: Justin Chancellor; Shelee Dykman
- Products: books, music, magazines

Lobal Orning was a record and book store located in the mountains north of the Pacific Coast Highway in the small community of Topanga, California, United States.

It sold a selection of music and books, from classic literature to pulp. The store was described by local press as "one of Topanga’s unfortunately best-kept secrets".

The store was run by rock musician Justin Chancellor of the band Tool, and his wife Shelee Dykman, who coined the phrase "lobal orning" which meant "to decorate the mind", in the sense of ornamenting the lobes of the brain. The store closed March 1, 2008.
