= Spoonbill & Sugartown Books =

Bookstore in Brooklyn, New York

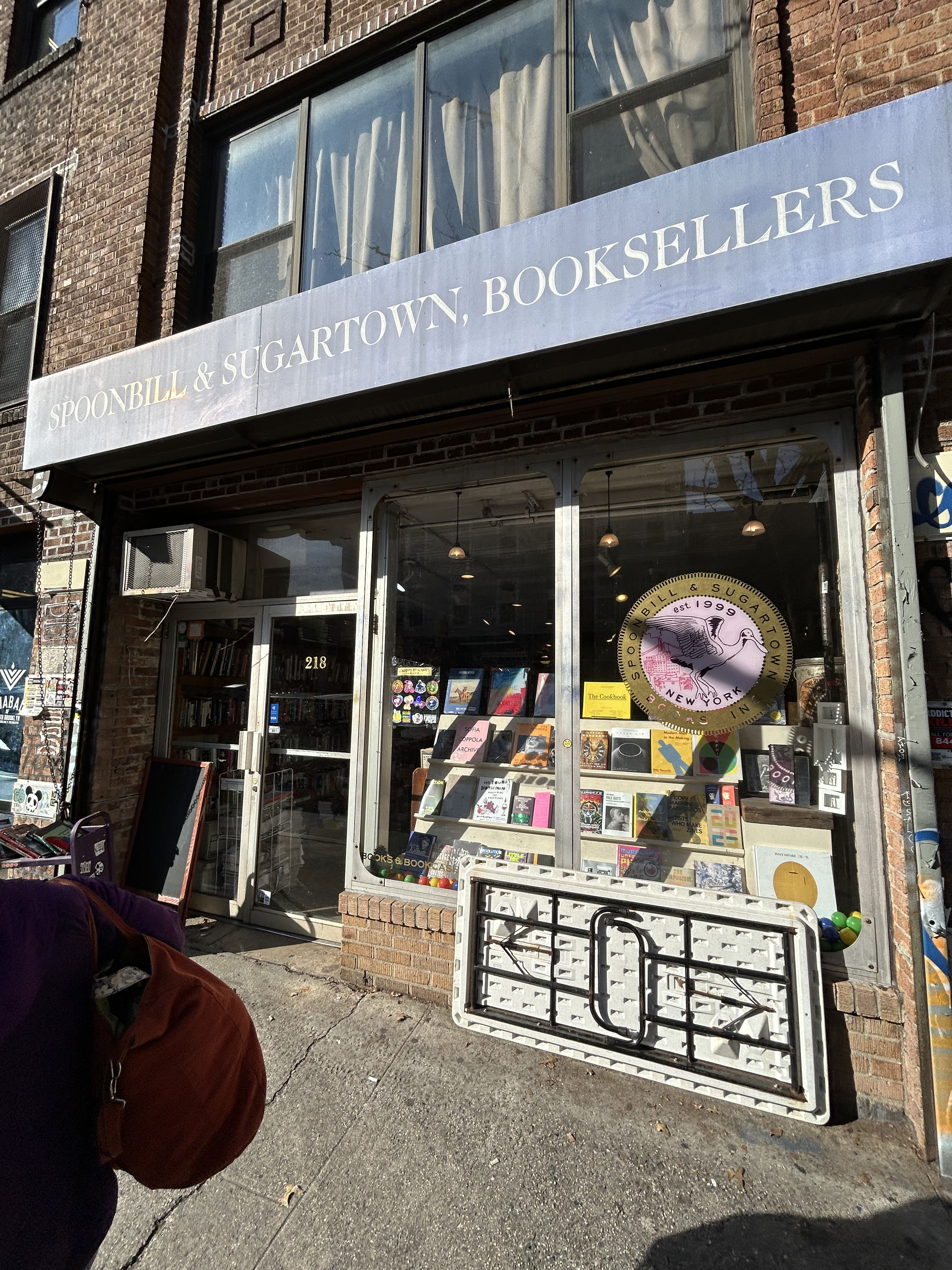
- Inside of the bookstore in 2024

General information
- Address: 218 Bedford Avenue; Brooklyn, NY 11211
- Coordinates: 40.71676°N 73.95923°W

Spoonbill & Sugartown Books is an American independent bookstore on Bedford Avenue in Williamsburg, Brooklyn, New York. Founded in 1999, it sells new, used, and rare books in a variety of genres with emphasis on art, design, and architecture.

== History ==
In 1999, Spoonbill & Sugartown Books was founded by Miles Bellamy and Jonas Kyle on Bedford Avenue in Williamsburg. Bellamy and Kyle had met each other working at another bookstore for a few months in the eighties. Originally, the two scouted Tribeca for the bookstore's location but settled in Williamsburg. In 2003, Quentin Rowan joined as an owner.

During the COVID-19 pandemic, the bookstore elected to stay open, citing it as a crucial decision for the bookstore's survival. The book's staff worked with "reduced hours" and only permitted "six customers at a time." They also ran a fundraiser on GoFundMe to sustain the bookstore's operations, raising over $100,000 by June of 2020. In 2021, Bellamy stepped down from co-ownership of the bookstore.

Past events have included "Paul Auster, Leslie Scalapino, Eileen Myles; artists like Vito Acconci, Lisa Yuskavage; critics and curators such as Jed Perl, Bob Nickas," and others.

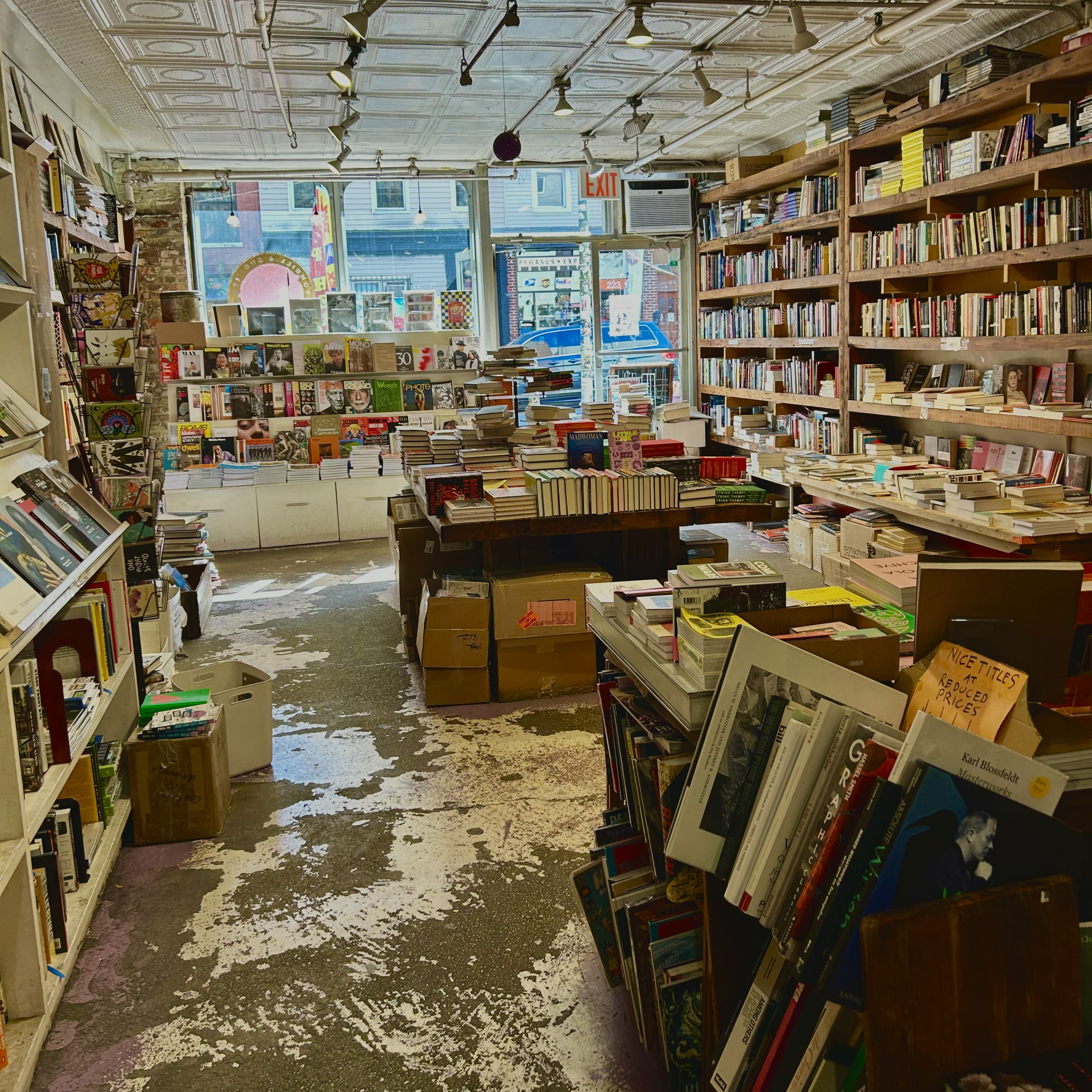
Inside of the bookstore

== In the media ==
Spoonbill & Sugartown Books has appeared in numerous publications. Co-owners Bellamy and Kyle have been profiled in The New Yorker, The Brooklyn Rail, and other magazines. The bookstore's cats, Hayes and Rainer, have also been profiled. Racked included it in a list of the 20 best independent bookstores in New York City, as well as an article about where to shop in Williamsburg. Condé Nast Traveler has written about the bookstore several times in articles about Williamsburg and the city writ large. The bookstore also made an appearance in the show Girls, directed by Lena Dunham.
