= Black Garnet Books =

Bookstore in Minnesota

- Formation: 2020; 6 years ago
- Founder: Dionne Sims
- Type: Bookstore
- Headquarters: 1319 University Ave W, St Paul, MN 55104
- Coordinates: 44°57′22.02″N 93°9′18.87″W
- Website: https://www.blackgarnetbooks.com/

Black Garnet Books is a bookstore in Minnesota. The first of two Black-owned, brick and mortar bookstores in the state, it operated as a pop-up for a year before receiving a grant from the city of Saint Paul, Minnesota, to open a physical location.

== Establishment ==
Dionne Sims
(@OhDionne)
tweeted:

Minnesota doesn't have a black-owned bookstore. I think that's my new dream.

June 15, 2020

In June 2020, University of Minnesota graduate Dionne Sims discovered that there were no Black-owned bookstores in the state of Minnesota while researching ways to support the Black community after the murder of George Floyd. (Ancestry Books, a Black-owned bookstore in Minnesota, closed in 2015. Griot Arts in Rochester, MN, opened in 2024. Other Black-owned book businesses, such as Mind's Eye Comics and Babycake's Book Stack, do not have brick and mortar bookstore locations.) After Sims posted a tweet expressing her desire to start a Black-owned bookstore in the state, the tweet received more than 14,000 likes, and she began a crowdfunding campaign for the bookstore on July 10. By July 12, the campaign had raised more than $81,000. Overall, she raised more than $108,000 in the campaign using GoFundMe.

In 2021, Black Garnet Books operated as a pop-up. Sims told the Star Tribune that funds raised from the crowdfunding campaign helped to cover the startup costs and pay for inventory but that they did not cover construction of a physical bookstore space. Also in 2021, Saint Paul City Councilor Mitra Jalali provided Sims with information about a Neighborhood STAR grant, and she received a $100,000 grant from the city of Saint Paul to renovate and open a location at Hamline Station in the Midway neighborhood. The 1,800 square feet (170 m^{2}) space opened in October 2022.

Sims intentionally focused on making her store's space accessible, including waiting for a space that had an accessible restroom and no stairs, in addition to interior design elements that make it easier for someone using a wheelchair, as one example, to navigate.

=== Purpose ===
Black Garnet Books was planned to focus on Black authors and other diverse authors, and to stock books for adults and young adults to avoid competition with Babycake's Book Stack, a bookmobile in Saint Paul, Minnesota, focused on diverse children's literature. Sims told Mpls.St.Paul in 2020 that she wanted the bookstore to be "a place people can go for self-empowerment" through "education, connection, [and] the pursuit of knowledge".

In 2023, Sims told the Minnesota Spokesman-Recorder that every single book carried in the store is by Black, Indigenous, or other people of color.

== Activity ==
In November 2021, Black Garnet Books began a book drive on Bookshop.org to donate copies of The 1619 Project: A New Origin Story to schools in the Minneapolis–Saint Paul area. As of December 14, 2021, the drive had drawn more than 700 donations.

The store has hosted book-related events, such as author meet-and-greets, and non-book events such as speed dating and art fairs.
