= J. Levine Books and Judaica =

Bookstore in New York, USA

Coordinates: 40.7463°N 73.9870°W

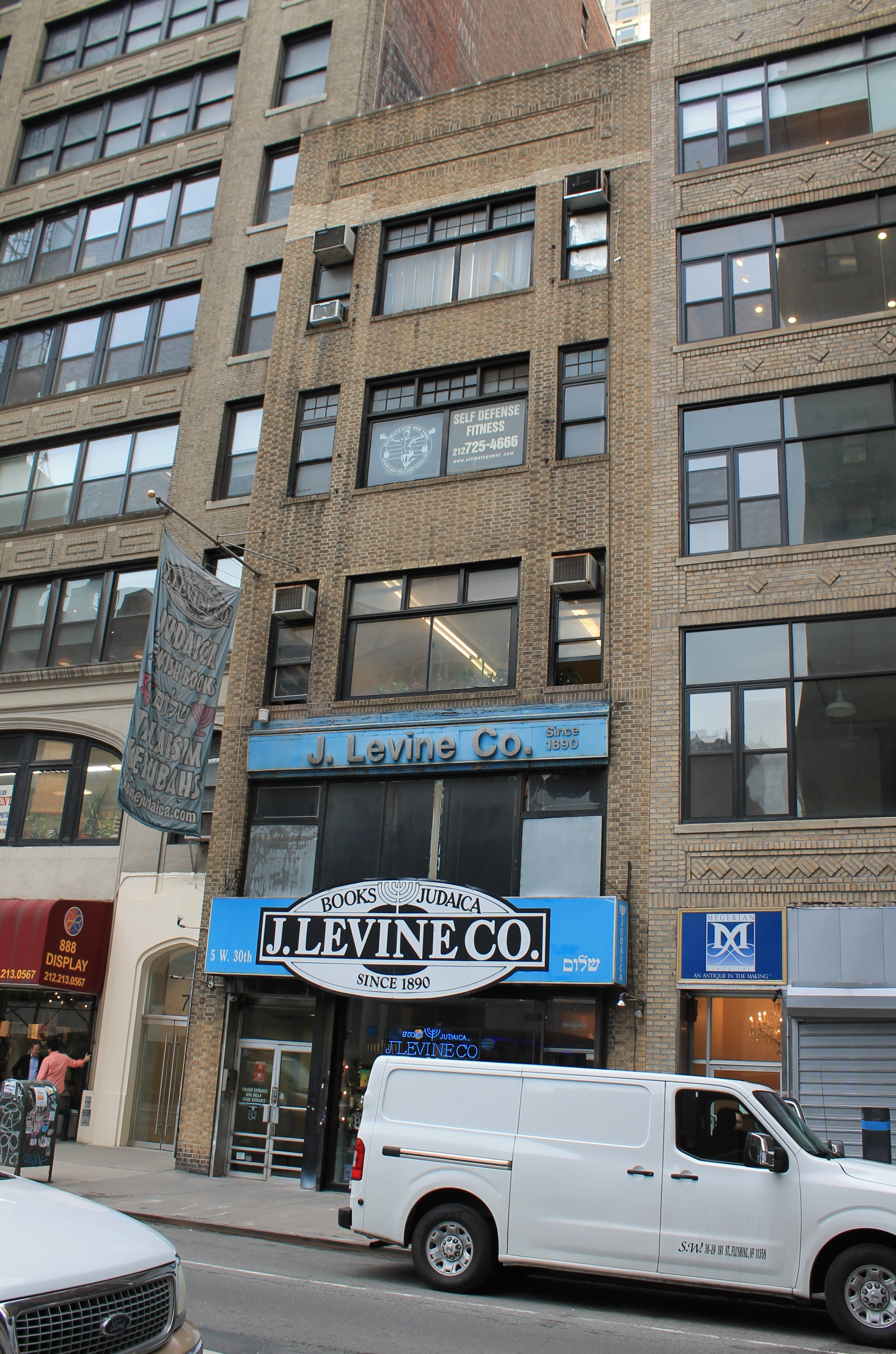
- 5 West 30th Street headquarters.
- Founded: Vilkomir, Lithuania (1890); New York City (1905)
- Founder: Hirsch Landy
- Headquarters: 5 West 30th Street, New York, New York, U.S.
- Products: Judaica, books
- Owner: Daniel Levine
- Website: levinejudaica.com

J. Levine Books and Judaica is an independent bookstore located in Midtown Manhattan. J. Levine is a fifth-generation family business and one of the oldest standing Judaica stores in United States since it opened in 1905.

== History ==
The business was founded in 1890 in Vilkomir, Lithuania, where sofer Hirsch Landy began selling the Torah scrolls he produced. In 1905, he immigrated to the United States and continued the business as a pushcart on the Lower East Side. In 1920, his son-in-law Joseph Levine incorporated and expanded the business to selling synagogue vestments, and his sons Harold, Melvin and Seymour Levine continued the business.

J. Levine expanded to its current location in Midtown Manhattan, where it offers books, menorahs, and various Judaica, including gifts and children's games and toys that are popular during Hanukkah.

Like many traditional booksellers, the store saw a decrease in sales in the first few years of the 2000s, as Amazon.com surged in popularity. Seymour's son Daniel Levine, the fourth-generation owner, said business dropped 18 percent from 2000 to 2005. However, the store expanded its own business online in order to compete, and sales rose 20 percent, Levine said.

In 2019 after 130 years operating a Judaica store, the J Levine Manhattan store closed its brick and mortar store. It retains its online store and continues a Torah rental business and a retail Ketubah store in Manhattan by appointment.

== Bibliography ==
- Jackson, Kenneth T., ed. (1995). The Encyclopedia of New York City. New Haven: Yale University Press. ISBN 0300055366.
