= Haslam's Book Store =

Book store in St. Petersburg, Florida, United States

Coordinates: 27.771341°N 82.660817°W

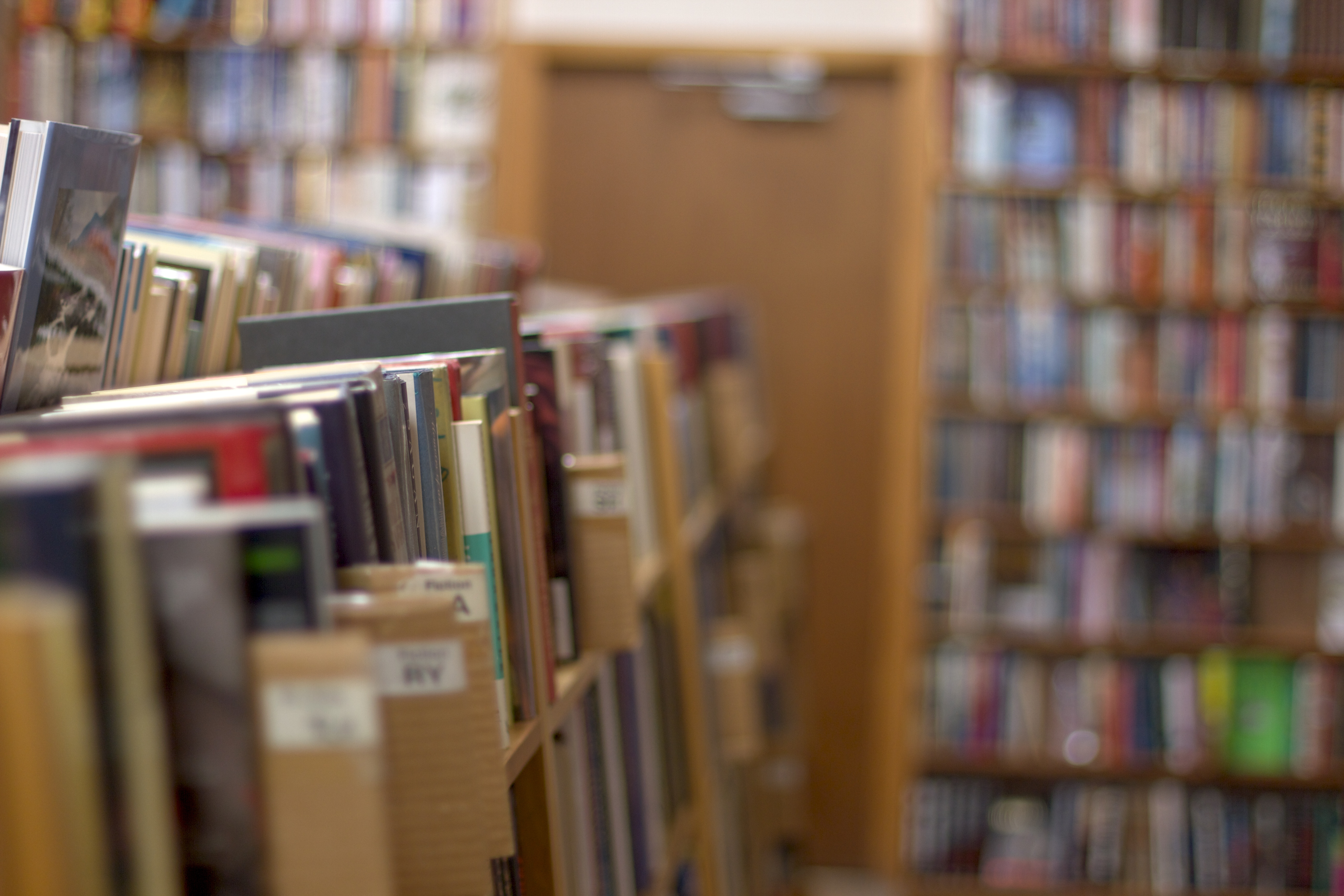
Shelving at Haslam's

Haslam's Book Store was a historic new and used independent bookstore in St. Petersburg, Florida. It was located in the Grand Central District and was the largest independent bookstore in Florida with over 30,000 square feet. Haslam's was started in 1933 by John and Mary Haslam. Their son Charles and his wife, Elizabeth, joined them in running the business after World War II. The store was originally a magazine exchange.

Writer Jack Kerouac was a frequent visitor. There have been many claims of Kerouac's ghost frequenting the store.

In 2017, HuffPost placed Haslam's as number forty-one on their list of top fifty bookstores in America.

As per the Haslam's website the store closed 'in the interest of public safety' on March 22, 2020, and has not reopened since.
