= The Lit. Bar =

Book store in Mott Haven, the Bronx

Coordinates: 40°48′26″N 73°55′39″W

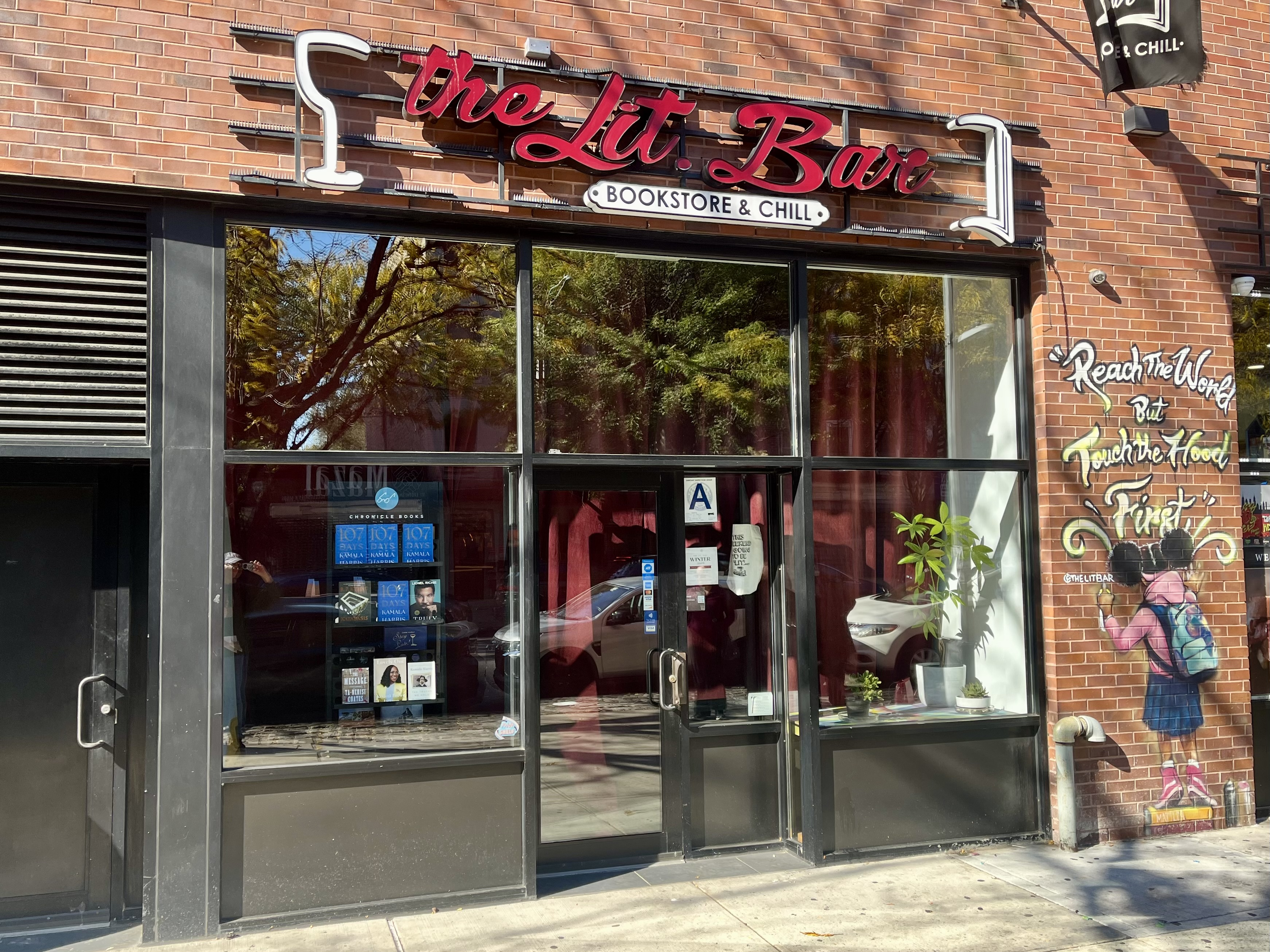
- The store's exterior in 2025
- Industry: Independent book store; Wine bar
- Founded: 2015
- Founder: Noëlle Santos
- Headquarters: 131 Alexander Avenue, Bronx, New York
- Number of locations: 1
- Area served: South Bronx
- Website: https://www.thelitbar.com/

The Lit. Bar is an independent book store in the Mott Haven section of the Bronx in New York City, U.S. The store is owned by Bronx native Noëlle Santos, who opened it after reading in 2014 that a Barnes & Noble near Co-op City was going to close: while Manhattan had 90 book stores, the Barnes & Noble branch was the only book store in the Bronx.

Prior to opening her store, Santos had been a business major, but had no experience selling books. In 2015, Santos took an "Owning a Bookstore" course, registered the Lit. Bar brand, and then began to work in local book shops, volunteering her time in return for practical experience running a business. She entered the 2016 New York StartUp! Business Plan Competition, winning second place and using the $7,500 prize money to fund a pop-up book shop at the Bronx Museum of the Arts. At the end of 2016, Santos started a crowdsourcing campaign on Indiegogo called "Let's Bring a Goddamn Bookstore to the Bronx". The campaign, which featured a video with Santos performing a rap poem she had written, exceeded the $100,000 goal, raising what was variously cited as $170,000 or $200,000.

The store opened on April 27, 2019, with an opening ceremony attended by Bronx Borough President Reuben Diaz, who recited some lines from Santos's poem:

Thank you for opening your hearts and helping me show the world what many failed to see, that the Bronx is no longer burning except with the desire to read. And that we thrive just like the indie bookseller that you were told died. The numbers don't lie.

The date was significant for being Independent Bookstore Day, a celebration of the independent bookstores sponsored by the American Booksellers Association on the last Saturday in April.

The 1,700-square-foot (160 m^{2}) store is a combination book store and wine bar; the latter offering higher profit margins to offset the financial risks inherent in the independent book industry. In 2025, The New York Times said it "may be the most widely known example of the book-bar hybrid". Santos chose the South Bronx as her location to take advantage of the ongoing gentrification of the area, although also recognizing that rising rents due to gentrification are one of the problems facing independent book stores. In a 2019 interview, Santos said that gentrification was a "national epidemic" and admitted that while the Lit. Bar is encouraging it, gentrification of the South Bronx was happening before the Lit. Bar. Santos envisions the store as a place where new residents attracted by the gentrification can interact with the existing South Bronx population. The store features black feminist and local Bronx authors.
