= Eighth Day Books =

Bookstore in Wichita, Kansas, US

Coordinates: 37.6865°N 97.3026°W

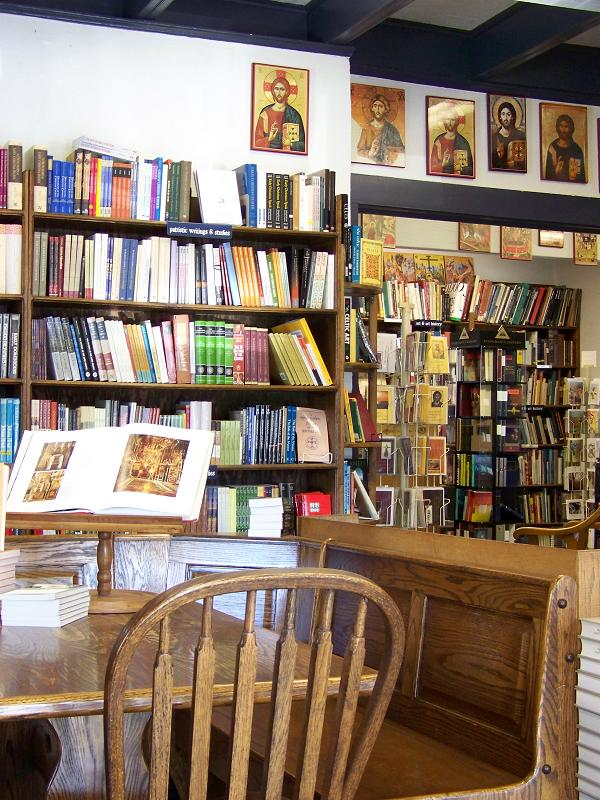
The interior of Eighth Day Books

Eighth Day Books is an independent bookstore founded in 1988 and located in Wichita, Kansas. It is known for its books that are classics of their genres, or else modern or contemporary works linked to the intellectual, artistic, and religious traditions of the East and West.

== History ==
Warren Farha, the founder of the bookstore, has written on the notion of bookselling as a vocation, citing a personal tragedy as the turning point in his life that led him to devote his life to the trade. The name of the store is drawn from the Patristic notion of the Eighth Day, referring literally to Sunday, and metaphorically to the eternal "day" of Jesus' resurrection.

== Philosophy ==
According to their website, Eighth Day "offer[s] an eccentric community of books based on this organizing principle: if a book—be it literary, scientific, historical, or theological—sheds light on ultimate questions in an excellent way, then it's a worthy candidate for inclusion in our catalog." The writer Lauren Winner reports that Farha defines the store's specialty as "the 'lasting' books...perennially important books." Mark Oppenheimer suggests that is "filled only with books Mr. Farha would read."

In addition, Eighth Day Books are known for their collection of religious—especially but not exclusively Christian—texts, particularly Roman Catholic and Eastern Orthodox works. Farha, who is Antiochian Orthodox, has summarized his vision for the bookstore as "about the unbreakable connections between all things that are true and good and beautiful. We'll live and die for Fr. Schmemann's insistence that you can't compartmentalize reality — separating things into 'religious' and 'secular, not religious.' We believe that doing so is a denial of God's 'very good' creation."

== Eighth Day Press ==
To date, Eighth Day Press has published seven books, focused primarily on works exploring or emanating from Catholic and Orthodox spirituality. The Press publishes the two most significant works of German writer Max Picard, Flight From God and The World of Silence; Recovered Body, a collection of poetry by Scott Cairns; Discerning the Mystery: An Essay on the Nature of Theology, by Andrew Louth; Clinging:The Experience of Prayer, by Emilie Griffin; Orthodox Spirituality and the Philokalia, by Placide Deseille; and The Feast of Friendship, by Fr. Paul O'Callaghan.

== Influence ==
Eighth Day Books is well-known within Christian intellectual and artistic circles, having been called by the writer Harold Fickett "surely the most idealistic (and one of the best) bookstores in America". Former Dallas Morning News columnist and religion author Rod Dreher has written that Eighth Day Books is "the best bookstore in the world" and the "Garden of Eden for Christian intellectuals–Catholic, Protestant, and Orthodox–interested in the Permanent Things". Image Journal, which invites Eighth Day Books to host a book table at its Glen Workshop each year, has dubbed Eighth Day Books the "Miracle of Wichita" and "Heaven's Bookstore". Other conferences at which Eighth Day Books' traveling book table is a regular fixture include Calvin College's Festival of Faith and Writing, Trinity Arts Conference in Dallas, Texas, Notre Dame's Center for Ethics and Culture Fall Conference, Baylor University's Symposium on Faith and Culture, and The CIRCE Institute.

== Catalog ==
Eighth Day Books previously published an annual catalog following the model made famous by A Common Reader, annotating each book with intimate, often whimsical, reviews. Writer, theologian and activist Jim Forest, in a blog entry titled "the vocational bookseller," singles out the book descriptions written for the catalog in saying "I know of no book shop so likely to have books -- new and used -- of special interest to Orthodox or Catholic Christians.". Eric Scheske, a lawyer and writer who keeps the noted Daily Eudemon blog says, "Their annual catalog isn't just a catalog: it's a piece of literature. Anyone who loves books and wisdom as much as these folks, anyone who passes along excellent reading advice by the shelf-load like these folks, merits patronage". James Kushiner, Executive Editor of Touchstone Magazine has also singled out the writing of Eighth Day's catalog as worthy of mention, saying it's "the most fun I've had reading a catalog in a while".

At its height, the catalog was mailed to 25,000 recipients per year. After its suspension in 2012, the publication was revived in 2020.
