= Troubled Sleep (bookstore) =

Bookstore in Brooklyn, New York

- Interactive map of the Troubled Sleep area

General information
- Location: 129 Sixth Ave; Brooklyn, NY 11217
- Coordinates: 40.67829°N 73.97583°W

Troubled Sleep is a Brooklyn independent bookstore in Park Slope. Founded in 2022, it sells new and used books in various genres with an emphasis on literary fiction. It also buys used books.

== History ==
Troubled Sleep was established in the Park Slope neighborhood by a group of local booksellers known for opening Book Thug Nation in 2009 and other bookstores. It opened in August of 2022 on 129 Sixth Avenue, taking up the ground floor of a three-story building that was previously leased to a pet store. An individual involved with building the bookstore cited Enzo Mari's Autoprogettazione as an influence for its design.

The bookstore is co-owned by a collective of creatives who also run Book Thug Nation, Human Relations, and Codex. Artist and organizer, Josh MacPhee designed the logo.

== Name ==
Despite the bookstore sharing the same name as Troubled Sleep, a 1949 novel by Jean-Paul Sartre, co-owner and manager Alex Brooks said that "none of us have read it and it was not the inspiration for the name." "Dead Souls", after Nikolai Gogol's novel of that name, was also considered for the bookstore's name per Brook's recommendation, but it was turned down as to not offend a nearby church.

== In the media ==
Troubled Sleep has been recommended by numerous publications. Washington Square News mentioned it in a list for Independent Bookstore Day in 2023. Passerby listed it as a favorite for a piece on secondhand bookstores in New York City. Brownstoner recommended it for Small Business Saturday in November of 2022.
