= Astoria Bookshop =

Bookstore in Queens

Coordinates: 40°45′23″N 73°55′51″W

- Industry: Independent bookstore
- Founded: 2013
- Headquarters: Queens
- Website: astoriabookshop.com

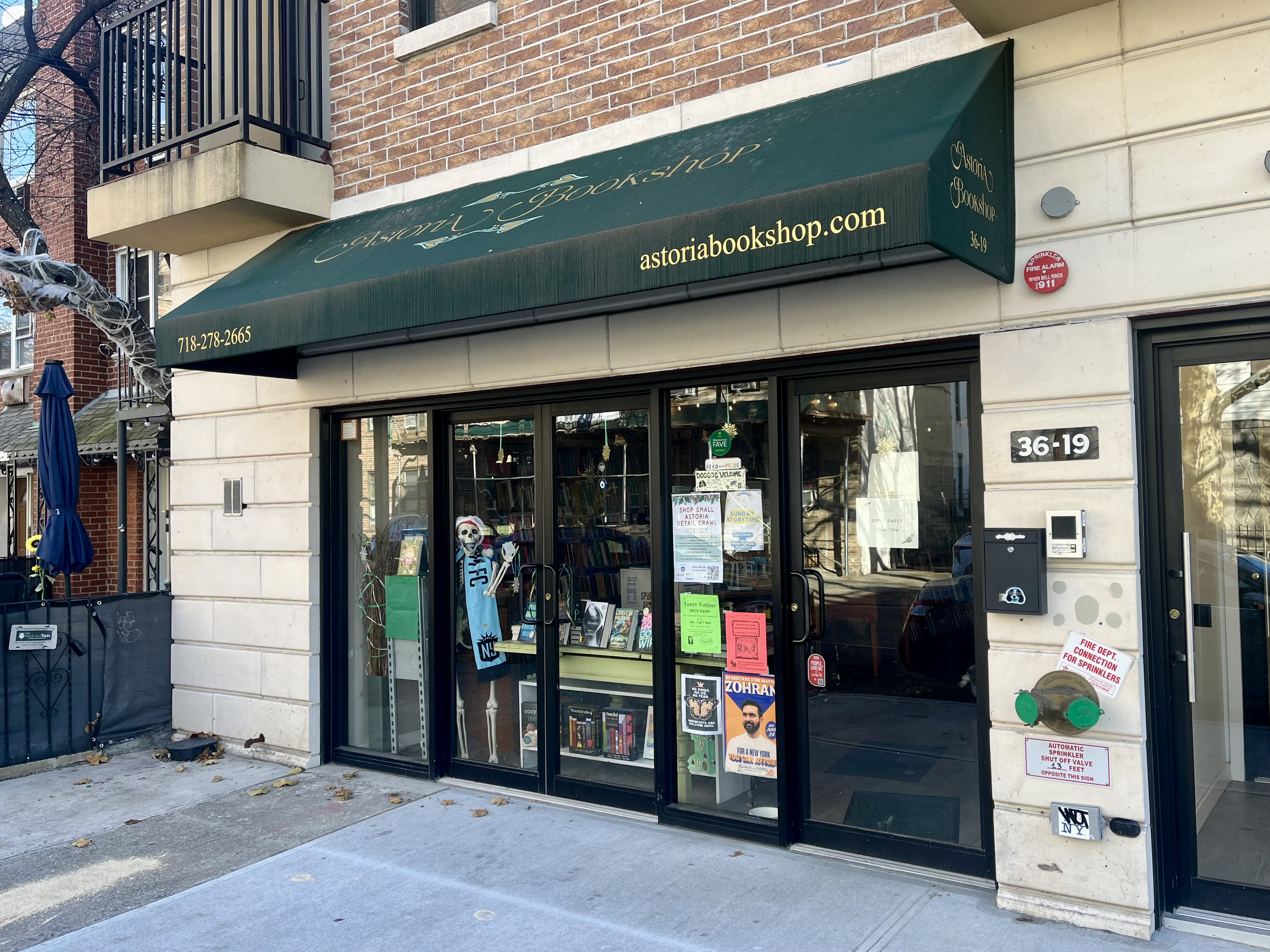
The bookshop in 2025

Astoria Bookshop is an independent bookstore in Queens. A LGBTQ-owned, woman-owned business founded by Lexi Beach in 2013, it sells books in various genres, hosts regular events with authors, facilitates a book club, and occasionally runs holiday book drives. Originally located on 31st Street in Astoria, the store moved to a larger location on 30th Street in 2023.

== History ==
Beach and her wife, Connie Rourke, opened Astoria Bookshop in 2013. In August 2023, Beach moved Astoria Bookshop from its old address, 31-29 31st Street, to a larger storefront nearby on 36-19 30th Street.

The bookstore has hosted events with authors like Roxane Gay, Elizabeth Sanders, Judy Blume, Erik Didriksen, Dave Roman, Samantha Berger and Isabel Roxas, Stephen Savage, Ananda Lima, and others.

== In the media ==
Staff from Astoria Bookshop have been interviewed in several publications including LitHub, BuzzFeed News, and Electric Literature. In 2019, Beach wrote an op-ed in Electric Literature about her decision to not stock The Wizenards, a children's series published by Kobe Bryant's Granity Studios, in Astoria Bookshop due to Bryant's sexual assault case.

And Other Stories named it bookshop of the month for August 2023. Time Out New York ranked it second for best bookstores in New York City, stating it "delivers a much-needed dose of lit to the neighborhood" and featured it in other lists. Afar called it a bookstore in the city that they love. Tinybeans included it on a list of New York City's best independent bookstores for kids. It has been featured on several lists about LGBTQ bookstores in NBC, O, The Oprah Magazine, and others.
