= Prairie Avenue Bookshop =

Coordinates: 41.8764°N 87.6265°W

The Prairie Avenue Bookshop was an architectural bookstore located in Chicago, Illinois, a city known for its rich architectural history. It has been called "the best architectural bookshop in the world," by the Financial Times. The bookstore closed permanently following their last day of operation Monday, August 31, 2009.
