= Matt Sedillo =

American writer (born 1981)

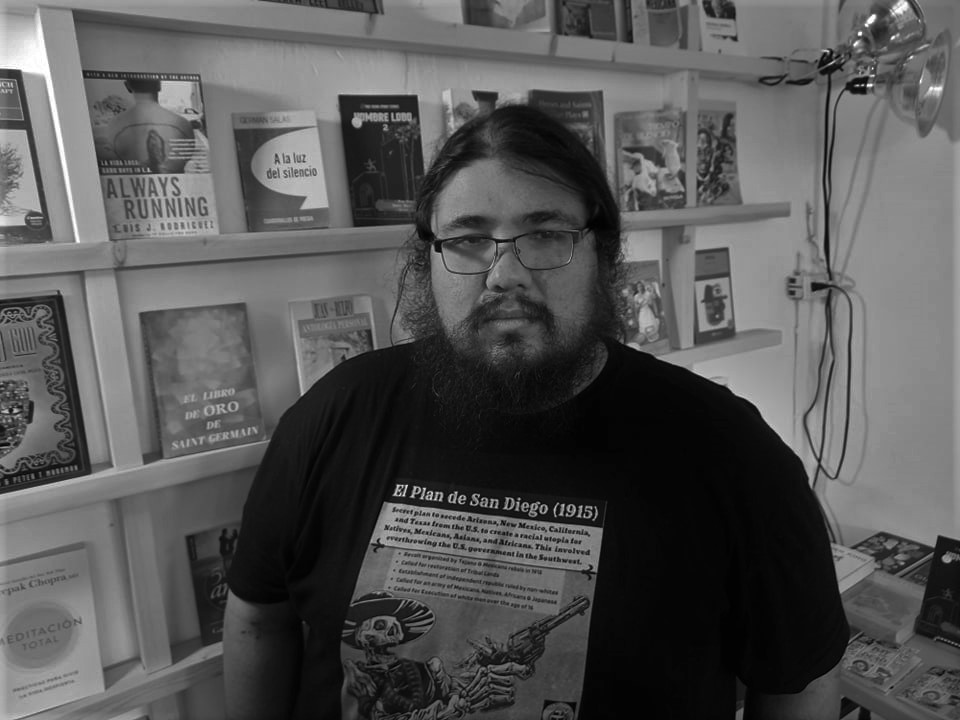
Portrait shot of Chicano poet Matt Sedillo

Matt Sedillo (born December 18, 1981) is a Chicano political poet, essayist, and activist.

== Biography ==
Sedillo was born on December 18, 1981, in El Sereno, Los Angeles, California. His poetry was compared to that of Amiri Baraka's by the Hampton Institute, He has been described as the best political poet in America by investigative journalist Greg Palast and as the "poet laureate of struggle" by historian Paul Ortiz. He has been described as one of the most important working class intellectuals of our time. He has spoken at the San Francisco International Poetry and the Texas Book Festival. He was featured on C-SPAN at the 2016 Left Forum and has had numerous international speaking engagements including Casa de las Americas in Havana, Cuba.

At Re/Arte Centro Literario in Boyle Heights, Los Angeles, California, Sedillo facilitates a writers workshop every Wednesday. He is currently the literary director at the dA Center for the Arts in Pomona, California.

== Works ==
- For What I Might Do Tomorrow Caza de Poesía. 2010. ISBN 9781936293223
- Mowing Leaves of Grass FlowerSong Press. 2019. ISBN 9781733809290
- City on the Second Floor FlowerSong Press. 2022 ISBN 1953447899
