= World Bank Infoshop =

Defunct nonprofit bookstore in the U.S.

Coordinates: 38.899°N 77.041°W

InfoShop, The World Bank
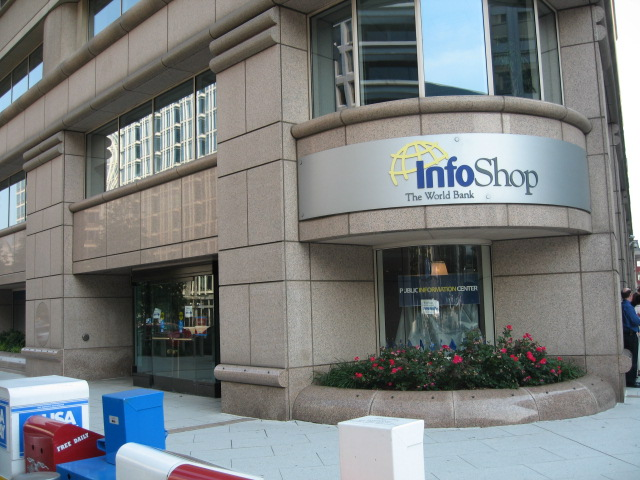
- Interactive map of InfoShop, The World Bank
- Former names: Created as a merger of the World Bank's bookstore and public information center
- Location: 701 18th St. NW, Washington, D.C.
- Owner: The World Bank
- Type: Bookstore

Construction
- Opened: 2000
- Expanded: to books not published by the World Bank in 2001; public events program began in 2005
- Closed: 2016

Website
- InfoShop, The World Bank

The InfoShop was a non-profit bookstore in Washington, D.C., run by the World Bank specializing in "economics and international development ... current events, history, banking and finance, plus travel guides, reference books and international fiction", including discounted and remaindered books. The shop offered discounts to students, and to customers who worked in government, NGOs, or the World Bank. The shop also sold children's books, world music CDs, books and audio for learning languages, gifts, and stationery supplies with the World Bank logo.

From 2005, the InfoShop featured public programs with "up-and-coming and internationally known authors." In 2006, the InfoShop became home to the first installation of the beta version of the Espresso Book Machine. By 2010 World Bank Publications (the World Bank Group's publishing organization) was recovering roughly two-thirds of the costs of operating the store through sales, in part because the publications of the World Bank are also made available free of charge online.

In October 2012, Occupy D.C. blockaded the doors of the InfoShop as a part of a protest against the World Bank, Verizon, Wells Fargo, and PNC Bank.

The Infoshop closed in October 2016 after 20 years of operation.

== See also ==
- Politics and Prose, D.C. bookstore
- Infoshop
