= Otto Bookstore =

Independent bookstore in Pennsylvania

Coordinates: 41.2413°N 77.0038°W

- Company type: Independent bookstore
- Founded: 1877; 148 years ago
- Founder: Alexander M. Dean
- Headquarters: Williamsport, Pennsylvania
- Website: www.ottobookstore.com

Otto Bookstore is an independent bookstore in Williamsport, Pennsylvania. It was founded by Alexander M. Dean in 1841. The store was named after his partner H.Y. Otto. While initially the store was located in Market Square, it later moved to West Fourth Street where it currently resides.
