= Computer Literacy Bookshops =

Chain of bookstores

Computer Literacy Bookshops was a local chain of bookstores selling primarily technical-oriented books in Northern California. It was founded in 1983 in Sunnyvale, California, where its concentration in technical books fit well with its Silicon Valley customer base.

Computer Literacy was acquired by CBooks Express in 1997, and after going public traded as fatbrain.com, selling books both online and in brick-and-mortar stores. Fatbrain was acquired by Barnes & Noble in 2000, which absorbed the company into its main enterprise, and shut down the physical stores the following year.

== History ==
The first Computer Literacy Bookshop was opened in March 1983 on Lawrence Expressway between Lakeside Drive and Titan Way in Sunnyvale, California, by founders Dan Doernberg and Rachel Unkefer. It was located in the heart of Silicon Valley, not far from where the original Fry's Electronics store opened two years later. In 1987 the company opened two additional stores: one on North First Street in San Jose and another in the TechMart complex near Great America in Santa Clara. The San Jose store was probably the largest computer bookstore in America, with over 14,000 square feet of floorspace dedicated to new computer books. The TechMart store subsequently relocated to the headquarters of Apple Computer, Inc. at One Infinite Loop in Cupertino.

The store not only sold books and periodicals but displayed galley pre-prints for skimming and editing, held author and guest engineer speaking events such as Gene Amdahl or Donald Knuth.

In 1993, the only East Coast location was opened in the Tysons Corner area of suburban Washington, DC to make a total of four bricks-and-mortar locations. On August 25, 1991, the company registered the domain name clbooks.com and began taking book orders from customers worldwide via email. Their UUCP hostname was clb_books.

== Acquisition by CBooks Express ==
In 1995, Chris MacAskill and Kim Orumchian started an online bookstore called CBooks Express, specializing in computer-related books. The domain for CBooks Express was cbooks.com. Computer Literacy Bookstores moved to sue CBooks Express for trademark infringement. Instead, CBooks Express acquired Computer Literacy Bookshops in June 1997; the merged company continued operating under the Computer Literacy name. The combined company became ComputerLiteracy.com, and it went public in 1998.

== Fatbrain ==
Soon after going public the company was renamed Fatbrain.com (NASDAQ FATB) after a six-month process to come up with a new name. Company executives worked with branding specialists Interbrand Group; but eventually a name suggested by the company's editorial director, Deborah Bohn, was chosen. Along with the new name, a new logo (an emoticon: {*}) and slogan were introduced.

== eMatter and MightyWords ==
In the summer of 1999 Fatbrain started selling electronic documents under the eMatter brand. This was eventually spun off as a new company called MightyWords.

== Acquisition by Barnes & Noble ==
Fatbrain.com was acquired and absorbed by Barnes & Noble, the large bookstore chain, in November 2000. The physical stores were finally closed on December 1, 2001, and the domain name clbooks.com was retired; it is now operated by an unrelated organization.
