= Rainy Day Books =

Bookstore in Fairway, Kansas, United States

Coordinates: 39.0336°N 94.6170°W

Rainy Day Books is an independent bookstore in Fairway, Kansas, a wealthy suburb of Kansas City, Missouri, and one of the leading independent bookstores in the United States. It was founded on November 4, 1975, and is owned and operated by Vivien Jennings.

Publishers Weekly says that "Rainy Day Books sets the gold standard" for author events. The store began as a used bookstore, offering a paperback exchange program where readers could trade used books for credit and pay a small fee to exchange for other paperbacks. Unlike many other used bookstores, Rainy Day Books never purchased stock from customers. Rainy Day Books was named a "Winning Workplace" for its innovative approach to business.

Rainy Day Books is a member of the American Booksellers Association as well as IndieBound, a national cooperative marketing group of independent booksellers.

Rainy Day Books was the plaintiff in a 2001 legal case that set the standard for Internet-based personal jurisdiction in Kansas. The case, Rainy Day Books, Inc. v. Rainy Day Books & Cafe, LLC, 2002 U.S. Dist. LEXIS 2043 (D. Kan. 2002), has been cited as precedent in numerous cases since.
