= Taylor Books =

Independent Bookstore in Charleston, West Virginia, US

- Taylor Books logo
- Interactive map of Taylor Books
- Address: 226 Capital Street; Charleston, West Virginia; US
- Coordinates: 38.350986°N 81.6329345°W
- Owner: Dan Carlisle (2021–present)
- Seating type: chairs, standing
- Type: bookstore, theater
- Events: folk music, spoken word
- Public transit: Kanawha Valley Regional Transportation Authority
- Parking: On Street

Construction
- Opened: 1995; 31 years ago
- Years active: 1995–present

Website
- taylorbooks.com

Taylor Books is an independent bookstore in Charleston, West Virginia. It specializes in Appalachian culture. It is credited with revitalizing downtown Charleston. It regarded as an institution for the state's artistic community.

== History ==
Taylor Books was founded by Ann Saville in 1995. The Charleston Town Center mall opening in 1983 had wiped out many local businesses. Capitol Street was largely abandoned by the 1990s, when Ann Saville purchased the building. During the restoration, artist Paula Clendenin inspired the ceiling's iconic red.

Taylor Books is the last independent bookstore in the state capital city. Intrinsically, it became West Virginia's main venue for author talks. Past speakers include William Brewer, Tony Caridi, and Stephen King.

The bookstore includes an Annex Gallery, a café, and pottery studio in the basement. The small stage in the front of the shop is where young Appalachian singer-songwriters get their start. Taylor Books serves as the box office for national music radio show Mountain Stage. Saville also founded the city's first brewery, which the bookstore carries. The Art Annex is a major attraction during the Festivall citywide arts festival and monthly art walks.

In 2021, long time store clerk Dan Carlisle became the owner of Taylor Books.

In September 2025, Ann Saville died at 90, and a memorial service was held inside Taylor Books.

== Awards ==
WCHS People's Choice Awards 2022 – Favorite Retail Shop
