= Warwick's =

Bookstore

- Industry: Specialty retail
- Founded: 1896
- Founder: William T. Warwick
- Headquarters: 7812 Girard Avenue, La Jolla, California, United States
- Owner: Nancy Warwick
- Website: https://www.warwicks.com/

Warwick’s is a bookstore in La Jolla, California. Founded in Mankato, Minnesota, in 1896, it is the oldest continuously family-owned bookstore in the United States. William T. Warwick brought the business to La Jolla in 1939, when he purchased Redding’s Book Store and renamed it Warwick’s.

== History ==
Warwick's was founded in 1896 by William T. Warwick in Minnesota. The bookstore later moved to Iowa and then to La Jolla, California, where Warwick bought Redding's Book Store and renamed it Warwick's in 1939.

In 1952, Warwick's moved to its current location at 7812 Girard Avenue in La Jolla, California. The business passed from William T. Warwick to his son Charles, then to his grandson Bob. Bob's daughters, Nancy Warwick and Cathy Warwick-O'Neill, took ownership in 2001, becoming the fourth generation of the family to run the store.

In 2021, the owner of the building where Warwick's was located planned to sell the building. Nancy Warwick reached out to the community and was able to raise $8.35 million to buy the building. More than thirty people contributed to the fund.
