= New World Resource Center =

Non-profit bookstore in Chicago, Illinois, USA

New World Resource Center was a not-for-profit, volunteer-run bookstore and meeting space located in Chicago. It claimed to be Chicago's "oldest independent left-wing and labor bookstore and meeting center, providing books, periodicals, t-shirts, etc. to progressives and activists."

The NWRC was established by anti-imperialist activists in Chicago, having its roots in the Chicago chapter of the Committee of Returned Volunteers (CRV). Its initial office was on North Halsted Street in Chicago. The original members of the group were Eileen Hanson, Jennifer Leaning, Liza Zadel, Lori Dostel, Mimi Edmunds, Eileen Jackson, Trudy Pax and three others.

CRV was the first national organization of former Peace Corps Volunteers, church affiliated social justice volunteers, and others. CRV disbanded in 1971, during the height of Vietnam anti-war activism, when many CRV members moved more to the radical political left. The NWRC was the project of members of the disbanded Chicago CRV chapter who wished to continue their political activism with a sharper anti-imperialist focus.

NWRC's initial focus was international solidarity with revolutionary movements throughout the third world. The NWRC quickly became a major resources center for books, literature, films and speakers on liberation movements and anti-imperialist struggles in Africa, Asia and Latin America, including Angola, Mozambique, Chile, Cuba, South Africa and many others.

NWRC also adopted a non-sectartian left-labor-progressive orientation to promote collaboration and a healthy exchange of ideas amongst those adhering to disparate left ideologies. NWRC is not associated with any political party or any particular left ideology.

NWRC carried a variety of publications and books which pertain to such issues as anarchism, socialism, Marxism, left political theory, labor, anti-racism, African-American, feminism, environmentalism, human rights, international history/current events, media, education, Chicago left history, surrealism, the arts, and other related topics. New World also carried an extensive selection of left leaning magazines and newspapers. They had an extensive stock of Spanish language books, predominantly left-wing and progressive oriented.

Its last location was 1300 N Western Avenue, Chicago, IL 60622. NWRC was proud to be located in Chicago's historic Humboldt Park neighborhood. Its phone number was: +1.773.227.4011. Hours of operation were Tues-Fri: 3:00-9:00 pm; Sat-Sun: 12:00−7:00 pm; closed Mon.

NWRC hosted author talks, film screenings, forums, discussion groups, theatre performances and occasionally music in their dedicated meeting space. A number of groups regularly met in the space, including the Chicago Green Party, Vietnam Veterans Against the War, the Chicago branch of the Industrial Workers of the World, the latter two groups also rent office space at this facility.
