= Grassrootz Bookstore =

American bookseller and retailer

- Type: For Profit
- Predecessor: Archwood Exchange
- Founded: 2019; 7 years ago (as Archwood Exchange) in Phoenix, Arizona
- Founders: Ali Nervis, Tremikus Muhammed
- Headquarters: 1145 E Washington St Suite #200, Phoenix, AZ 85034, U.S.
- Products: Books, Apparel

Grassrootz Bookstore (also Grassrootz Books or simply Grassrootz) is a bookstore located in Phoenix near the downtown area. Grassrootz book selection mainly specializes in African-American literature, history, and culture in the United States. Inside the bookstore is a Juice bar and coffee shop inside as well as a collaborative workspace for the community. Grassrootz is Phoenix’s only Black-owned bookstore.

== History ==
Grassrootz officially opened On July 4, 2019, the store started in a hallway within the Afri-soul marketplace, originally all the books had were from the founders house. The current building space started renovation in 2019, which spanned over a month but completed to open the same year. Subsequently grassrootz saw a second opening on November the following year due to the COVID-19 pandemic business closures.

=== Name ===
The name "Grassrootz" comes from their mission and efforts to formulate independence and positivity in the Black Phoenix community.

== Rentals and online orders ==
Grassrootz has an in-store community library with flexible extensions and the ability to borrow a book for 30 days for only five dollars. They also accept online orders.

== Notable Guest ==
On May 17, 2021, Grassrootz Bookstore was visited by Phoenix's vice mayor Carlos García.
