= Baldwin's Book Barn =

Bookstore in Pennsylvania

Coordinates: 39.9376°N 75.6119°W

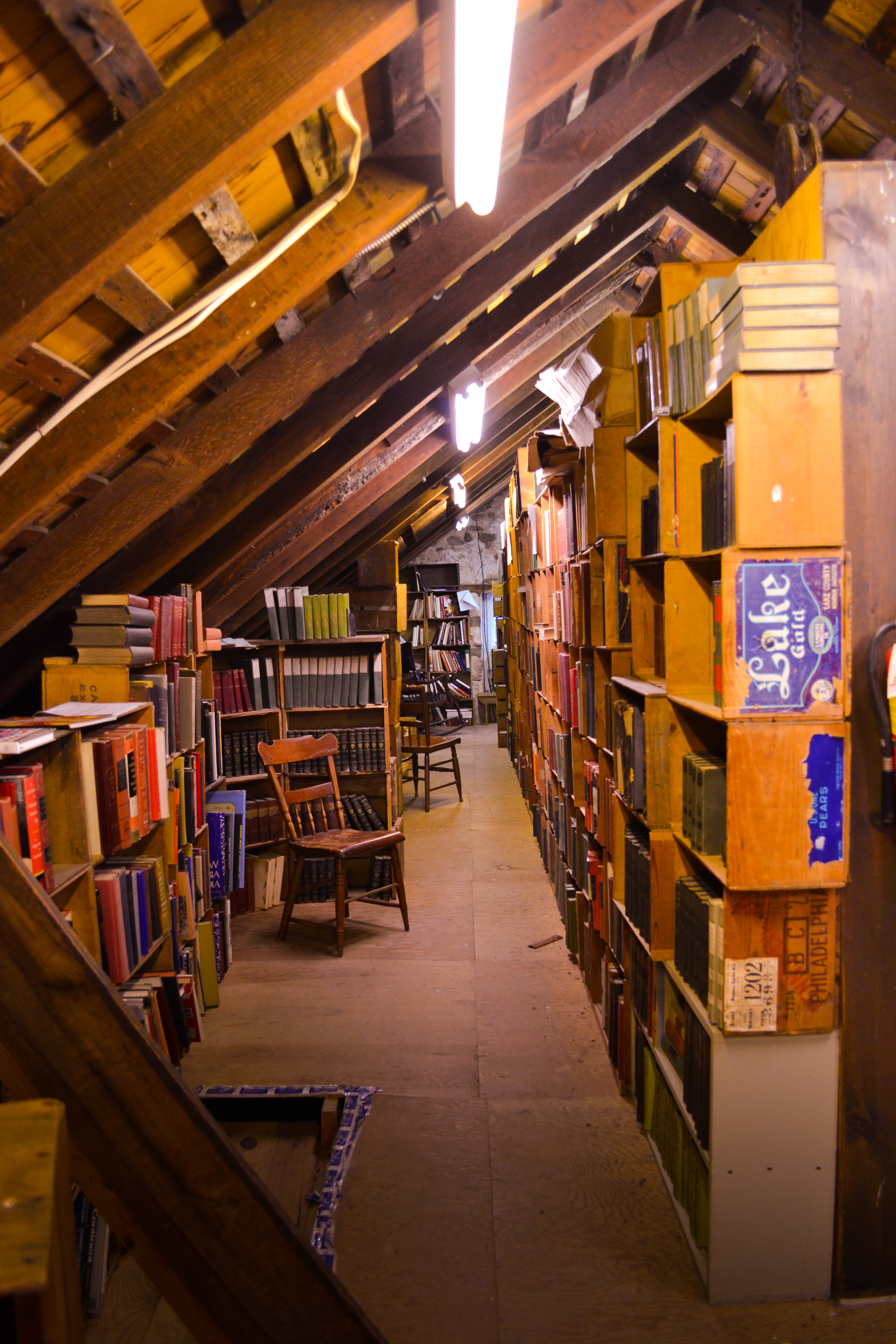
The top floor of the Book Barn

Baldwin's Book Barn is an independent bookstore in West Chester, Pennsylvania. It was founded in 1946 by William and Lilla Baldwin. The store is located in a five-story barn built in 1822.

In the November 8, 1998 edition of The Baltimore Sun, Terry Conway described the store as a "treasure for passionate book lovers".

In 2010 the store was put up for sale. $10,000 of rare books were stolen from the store in 2019.
