= Bart's Books =

Bookstore in Ojai, California

Coordinates: 34.4486°N 119.2497°W

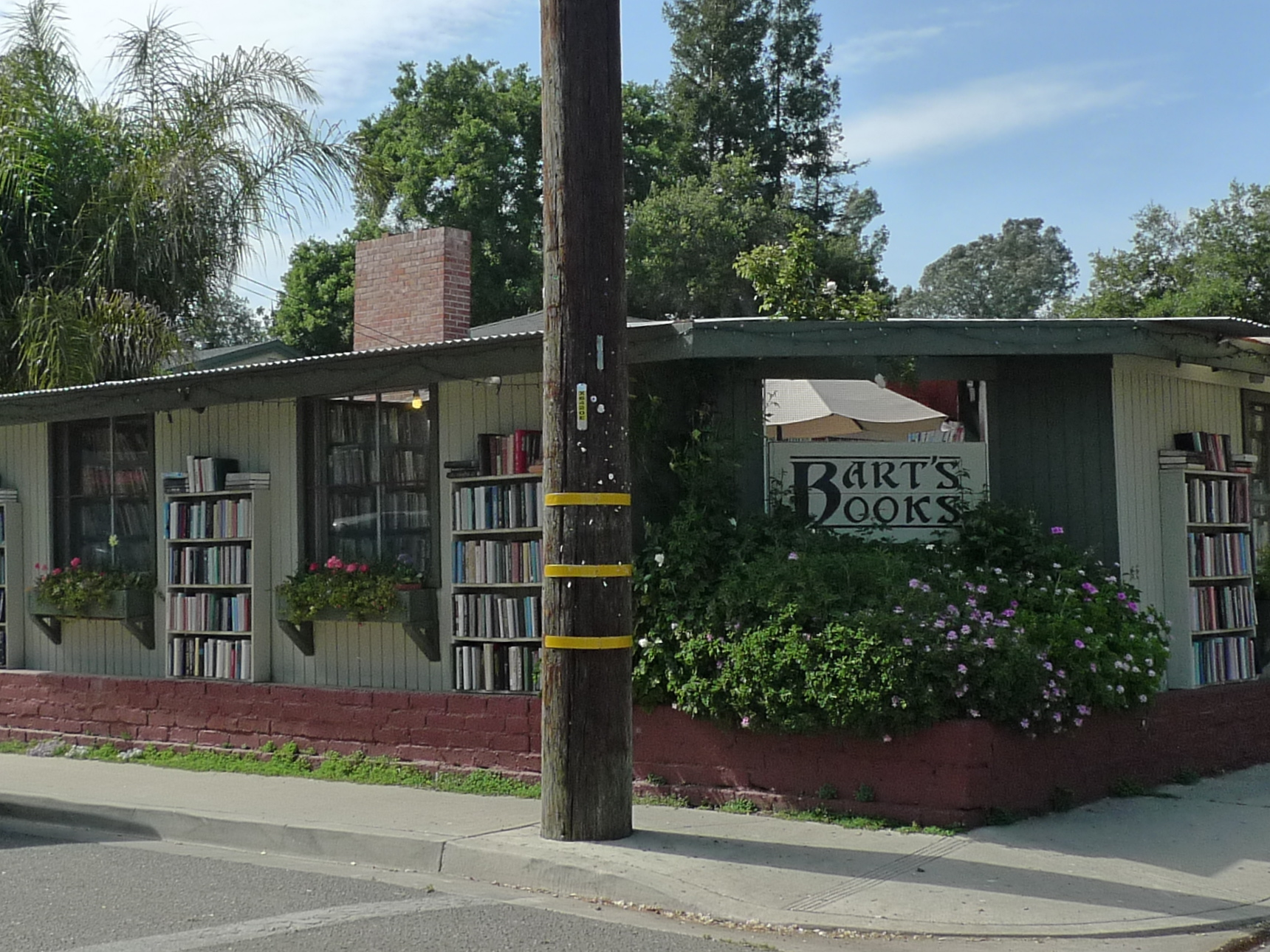
- Street view
- Formerly: Bart's Outdoor Bookstore
- Founded: 1964
- Founder: Richard Bartindale
- Headquarters: Ojai, California
- Owner: David and Andrea Grant
- Website: bartsbooksojai.com

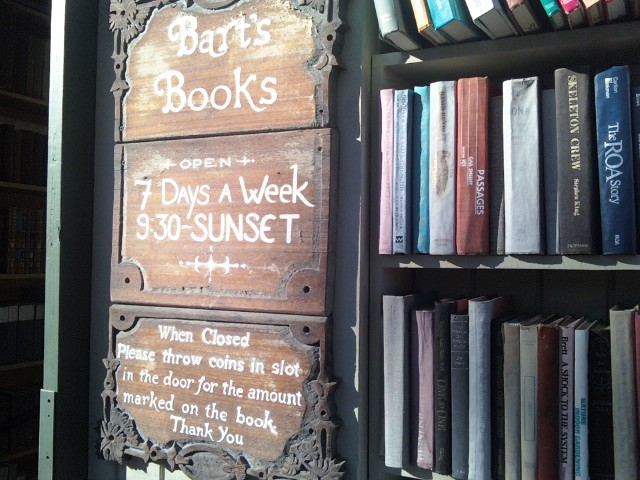
A sign with instructions for paying for books after hours.

Bart's Books is a bookstore in Ojai, California. It was founded by Richard Bartindale in 1964. In the outdoor section, shelves of books face the street, and patrons are asked to drop coins into the door's coin box to pay for any books they take whenever the store is closed.

Bart's Books has been featured in the 2010 movie Easy A and novels.

== Description ==
The outdoors section is surrounded by plants and bookshelves facing the street. There are over 100,000 used books, which are categorized depending on the room the books are in. When the store is closed, customers can pay for books shelved outside via a coin box. There was a 300 year old oak tree that grew inside of the bookstore; it was removed due to it falling into the street.

== History ==
Born in Oxford, Indiana, in 1917, Richard Bartindale was a World War II navigator for the United States Navy Reserve. After the war, Bartindale traveled across Europe; in Paris, he was inspired by the "open-air" style of bouquinistes. Having worked at bookshops across California, he founded Bart's Books in 1964. In the late 1960s, Bartindale and his family left Ojai, California, to travel to Oxford; ownership shifted to Gary Schlichter, a former landscaper, when he purchased the bookstore.

== In popular culture ==
Bart's Books appears at the start of Carl Hyndman's novel Bookstore on the Seine. The store was featured in Easy A, a 2010 American teen comedy movie.
