= Coliseum Books =

Independent bookstore in New York City

Coordinates: 40.7666°N 73.9821°W

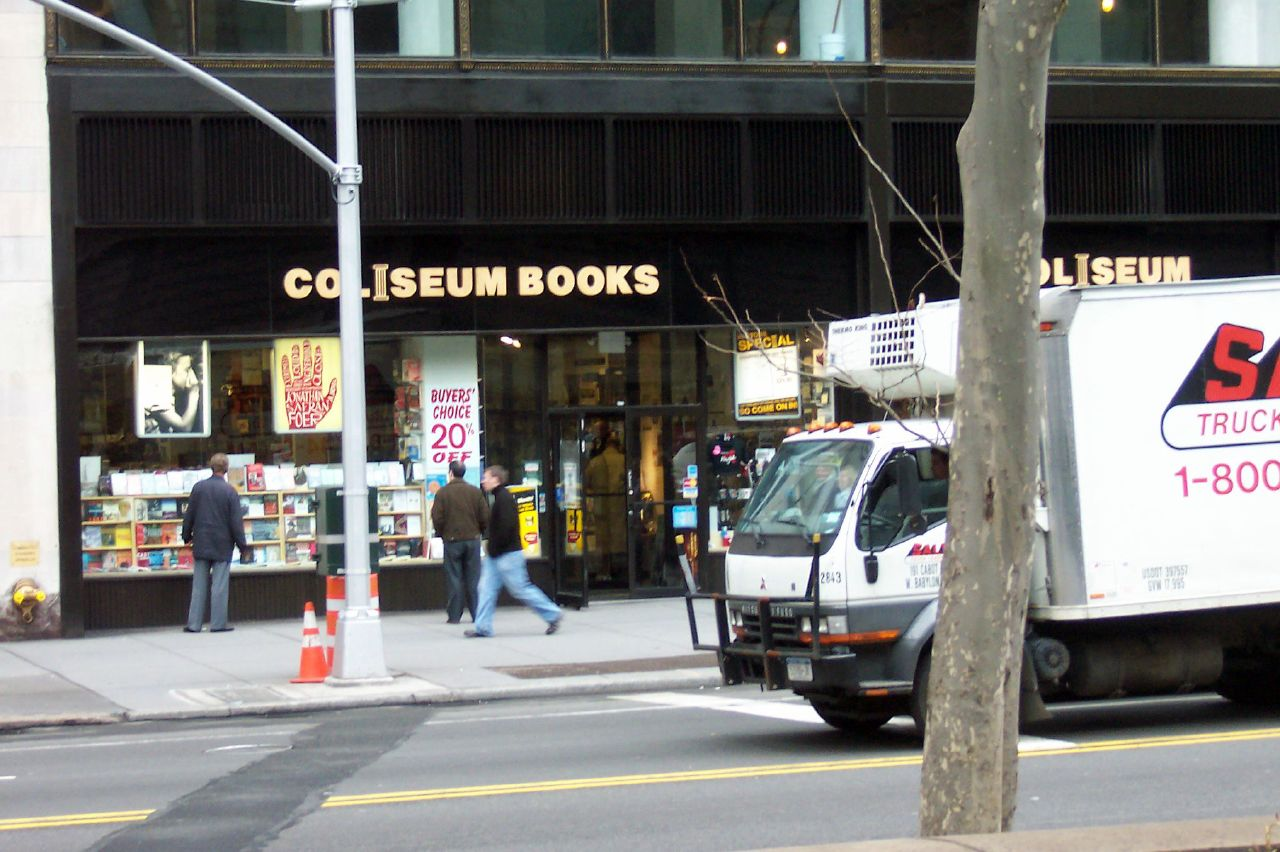
Coliseum Books in March 2005

Coliseum Books was an independent bookstore that opened in 1974 on the northwest corner of 57th Street and Broadway, near Columbus Circle in the New York City borough of Manhattan. After initially closing in 2002, following a series of financial difficulties and in part due to the increased real estate prices in that part of Manhattan, it relocated to its final location on 11 West 42nd Street near Bryant Park.

In early October 2006, after it filed for bankruptcy, Coliseum's founder and co-owner George Leibson announced that by the end of the year Coliseum Books would once again close permanently. Among the reasons cited for the possible failure of the newest incarnation of Coliseum were an inability to connect with potential book-buyers in its new market, high real estate prices and the decline of independent booksellers within New York City. Coliseum Books' final day of business was January 6, 2007.
