= List of bookstore chains =

This is a list of bookstore chains with brick-and-mortar locations.

In the United Kingdom and many parts of the English speaking world, they are known as "Bookshops" and "newsagents".

In American English, they are called "bookstores", or sometimes "newsstands", as they also usually carry newspapers and magazines. This list includes both current and defunct businesses, and also includes large independent bookstores that have multiple locations, but that use a different business model than most business chains.

For these lists, a chain is a bookstore with at least 4 locations.

== Current ==
Name	Country	Notes
Collins Booksellers	Australia	
Dymocks Booksellers	Australia	
Koorong	Australia	
Queensland Book Depot	Australia	
WHSmith	Australia	
Livraria Cultura	Brazil	
Archambault	Canada	13 (owned by Renaud-Bray)
Book City	Canada	4
Chapters	Canada	20 (owned by Indigo Books and Music)
Coles	Canada	56 (owned by Indigo Books and Music)
Indigo Books and Music	Canada	156 (including all Coles and Chapters locations)
Kobo eBookstore	Canada	
McNally Robinson	Canada	3
Renaud-Bray	Canada	31 (including all Archambault locations)
Joint Publishing	China	
Page One	China	
Popular	China	
The Commercial Press	China	
Rahva Raamat	Estonia	
Academic Bookstore	Finland	(Finnish: Akateeminen Kirjakauppa, Swedish: Akademiska bokhandeln)
Suomalainen Kirjakauppa	Finland	("The Finnish Bookstore")
Fnac	France	78 stores with book departments in France, 65 in 8 other countries
Hachette Distribution Services	France	
Furet du Nord	France	
Hugendubel	Germany	34 book-department-stores
Thalia	Germany	
Weltbild	Germany	closed since 2024, online assets taken over by Thalia
Ianos	Greece	
Eymundsson	Iceland	
A. H. Wheeler	India	
Crossword Bookstores	India	
DC Books	India	
Higginbotham's	India	
Landmark Bookstores	India	
Odyssey	India	
Oxford Bookstore	India	
Sapna Book House	India	
Gramedia	Indonesia	
Gunung Agung	Indonesia	
Eason & Son	Ireland	
Hodges Figgis	Ireland	part of the UK Waterstone's brand
Comikaza	Israel	former chain, still exists as a stand-alone store
Steimatzky	Israel	
Tzomet Sfarim	Israel	
Feltrinelli	Italy	
Arnoldo Mondadori Editore	Italy	
Giunti Editore	Italy	
Book Off	Japan	
Books Kinokuniya	Japan	
Culture Convenience Club	Japan	operates Tsutaya Bookstores
Libro	Japan	
Yurindo	Japan	
Kyobo Book Centre	South Korea	
Young Poong Books	South Korea	
Valters un Rapa	Latvia	
MPH Group	Malaysia	operates MPH Bookstores
myNEWS.com	Malaysia	
Popular	Malaysia	
Times Bookstores	Malaysia	
Fondo de Cultura Económica	Mexico	
Librerias Gandhi	Mexico	28 bookstores
Librería Porrúa	Mexico	
Audax Groep	Netherlands	Operates Amsterdamsche Kiosk Onderneming (AKO), Bruna, and Read Shop
De Slegte	Netherlands	small independent chain
Paper Plus	New Zealand	
Whitcoulls	New Zealand	
Ferozsons	Pakistan	
National Book Store	Philippines	
Rex Book Store	Philippines	
Empik	Poland	
Kolporter	Poland	
Livraria Bertrand	Portugal	
Jarir Bookstore	Saudi Arabia	
Page One	Singapore	
Popular	Singapore	
Times Bookstores	Singapore	
Exclusive Books	South Africa	
Orell Füssli	Switzerland	
Eslite Bookstore	Taiwan	
Asia Books	Thailand	
Dokya	Thailand	
Naiin	Thailand	
Blackwell's	United Kingdom	owned by Waterstones since 2022
Daunt Books	United Kingdom	founded by James Daunt in 1990
Foyles	United Kingdom	owned by Waterstones since 2018
The Works	United Kingdom	
WHSmith	United Kingdom	
Waterstones	United Kingdom	run by James Daunt since 2011
Barnes & Noble	United States	Owned by James Daunt since 2019. Locations across all 50 US states (614 stores).
Barnes & Noble Education	United States	former college division of B&N spun off in 2015 (760 stores).
B. Dalton	United States	Former large chain acquired by B&N in 1987; location now in Florida (1 store).
Bookmans	United States	Located in Arizona (5 stores).
Books-A-Million	United States	Locations across 32 US states (260 stores). Also operates Bookland and 2nd & Charles.
Busboys and Poets	United States	Located in the Washington metropolitan area (8 locations)
Deseret Book	United States	Utah regional chain; also operates Seagull Book.
Follett's	United States	
Half Price Books	United States	Locations across 19 US states (116 stores).
Hudson Group	United States	Located at airports and train stations in the United States and Canada (970 stores).
Powell's Books	United States	Located in Oregon (4 stores).
Sherman's Maine Coast Book Shops	United States	Located in Maine (9 stores)
Schuler Books & Music	United States	Located in Michigan (4 stores).
Tattered Cover	United States	Located in Colorado (6 stores); acquired by B&N in 2024.

== Historical ==
The following chains no longer operate any physical retail locations.

Name	Country	Notes
Angus & Robertson	Australia	Closed physical stores in 2011.
Borders	Australia	defunct
The Co-op Bookshop	Australia	defunct
Jongno Seojeok	South Korea	bankrupt, and name changed to Bandi & Luni's when re-opened
Fascination Books	South Africa	applied for liquidation in 2008.
Borders UK	United Kingdom	defunct in December 2009
Dillons the Bookstore	United Kingdom	all stores were rebranded as Waterstones in 1999
Ottakar's	United Kingdom	bought out by HMV, rebranded as Waterstones in 2006
Amazon Books	United States	physical stores closed in 2022
Borders	United States	defunct 2011. Trademark purchased by Barnes & Noble.
Cokesbury	United States	physical stores closed in 2012; continued as online retailer
Brentano's	United States	acquired by Waldenbooks and merged with Borders; defunct 2011
Crown Books	United States	defunct 2001
Encore Books	United States	defunct 1999
Family Christian Stores	United States	physical stores closed in 2017; online retailer since 2019
Hastings Entertainment	United States	defunct 2016
Kroch's and Brentano's	United States	Chicago regional chain; defunct 1995
LifeWay Christian Resources	United States	physical stores closed 2019; continued as online retailer
Media Play	United States	defunct 2006
Waldenbooks	United States	acquired by Kmart and merged with Borders; defunct 2011

== See also ==
- List of independent bookstores
- List of online booksellers
