= List of independent bookstores =

Independent bookstores are small bookselling businesses, usually with one or a small number of locations in a limited geographic area. They contrast with corporate or chain bookstores, operated by a larger company, often with many stores across a large area.

== Outside the United States ==
Name	Country	Location(s)	Notes
Foreign Language Bookshop	Australia	Melbourne	
Aqua Books	Canada	Winnipeg, Manitoba	(defunct)
Attic Books	Canada	London, Ontario	
Bakka-Phoenix	Canada	Toronto, Ontario	
Bison Books	Canada	Winnipeg, Manitoba	
Book City	Canada	Toronto, Ontario	
The Book Room	Canada	Halifax, Nova Scotia	was, at the time of its 2008 closing, the oldest bookstore in Canada (defunct)
Camas Bookstore and Infoshop	Canada	Victoria, British Columbia	
Common Woman Books	Canada		(feminist, defunct)
Glad Day Bookshop	Canada	Toronto, Ontario	
Highway Book Shop	Canada	Cobalt, Ontario	(defunct)
Hyman's Book and Art Shoppe	Canada		independent Jewish bookstore in Toronto, Ontario (defunct)
John W. Doull, Bookseller	Canada	Dartmouth, Nova Scotia	
Little Sister's Book and Art Emporium	Canada	Vancouver, British Columbia	
McNally Robinson	Canada		small independently run chain of stores across Canada
Mondragon Bookstore & Coffeehouse	Canada	Winnipeg, Manitoba	(defunct)
The Monkey's Paw	Canada	Toronto, Ontario	
Munro's Books	Canada	Victoria, British Columbia	
Spartacus Books	Canada	Vancouver, British Columbia	
This Ain't the Rosedale Library	Canada	Toronto, Ontario	(defunct)
Toronto Women's Bookstore	Canada	Toronto, Ontario	(defunct)
The Word Bookstore	Canada	Montreal	
José Corti	France	Paris	
Shakespeare and Company	France	Paris	
BuchGourmet	Germany	Cologne	
Atuagkat Bookstore	Greenland	Nuuk	
An Ceathrú Póilí	Ireland	Belfast	
Sefer ve Sefel	Israel	Jerusalem	
Al-Jahith's Treasury	Jordan		
Scorpio Books	New Zealand	Christchurch	
Solidaridad book shop	Philippines	Ermita district of Manila	
BooksActually	Singapore	Tiong Bahru	
Clarke's Bookshop	South Africa	Cape Town	
Fascination Books	South Africa		(defunct)
An Ceathrú Póilí	United Kingdom	Belfast	
Arthur Probsthain	United Kingdom	London	
Barter Books	United Kingdom	Alnwick Station, Northumberland	
Compendium Books	United Kingdom	London	
Daunt Books	United Kingdom	London	
Grass Roots Books	United Kingdom		
Housmans	United Kingdom	London	
Silver Moon Bookshop	United Kingdom		(defunct)
The Second Shelf	United Kingdom	London	
Stanfords	United Kingdom	London	

== See also ==
- Independent bookstore
- List of bookstore chains
