= DBH Deutsche Buch Handels GmbH & Co. KG =

German bookstore chain

- Industry: Book trading
- Area served: Germany

The DBH Deutsche Buch Handels GmbH & Co. KG (English: German Book Trading Inc. with sole general partner with a limited commercial partnership) based in Munich competes for being the major book trading company in Germany with rival Thalia.

== History ==
=== 2006 founding ===
The DBH was established in 2006 as a Holding and belongs at 50% to the Hugendubel Beteiligungs GmbH & Co. KG (English: Hugendubel Holding Inc.) and the Verlagsgruppe Weltbild GmbH. The DBH arose from the longtime cooperation between these two companies as a joint venture. Shareholders of the Verlagsgruppe Weltbild are 14 dioceses of the Roman Catholic Church in Germany and the Soldatenseelsorge Berlin (English: religious welfare for soldiers).

The DBH stated a volume of 675 million Euro for the first accounting year (2006). The company manages about 465 branches of both of the proprietor companies with about 3500 employees (effective: 2006). In Germany, Austria and Switzerland there are the subsidiaries Hugendubel (34 branches), Weiland (33), Buch Habel (17), Schmorl und von Seefeld (2), Wohlthat'sche Buchhandlung (about 50), Weltbild/Weltbild Plus/Weltbild Best (about 260), Jokers Restseller (18), Weltbild! (12), A&M and AM! (35).

=== 2008 ===
Since July 2008, the DBH owns 44 of the 89 book departments of the Karstadt Group. The remaining 45 departments were closed and the employees were moved to other departments.

Thalia tried the same but lost the competition for the partnership with Karstadt. The acquisition of the 44 departments was approved by the Federal Cartel Office (Germany) in April 2008. Eight further departments (in Kiel, Leipzig, Wiesbaden, Frankfurt and Munich) stayed unapproved for a while because of antitrust objections.

=== 2009 ===
Since 2009, huge measures of restructuring were adopted in the group for reducing personnel costs. As a first step, it began with layoffs in the partner company of the DBH, the Weltbild Verlagsgruppe.

Since May 2009, more layoffs followed in the dependent Weltbild plus. Because there were no works councils established, the abolishment of more than 320 posts could be accomplished unhindered and fast.

Since 30 June 2009, the back offices of Buch Habel (Darmstadt) and the Wohlthat'sche Buchhandlung (Berlin) were closed. The administration of these companies moved completely to the central office of the DBH. Huge rounds of dismissals followed at Buch Habel, Hugendubel and Wohlthat .

At Wohlthat, the measure could be largely implemented unchecked and closed to the public. In Berlin and Potsdam, the local works council was able to delay and to arouse public interest supported by the trade union Ver.di. Similar processes happened before at Buch Habel and Hugendubel. In November, 2009, the labour conflict started at Wohlthat.

In the end of 2009, the work councils in the DBH Group established a Group Works Council. This happened for expanding workers participation in the departments. The Group Works Council is able to kick-start elections for works councils in those enterprises which have difficulties to manage this on their own. Besides this task, the local works councils (which have much more power than the Konzernbetriebsrat in their range but none beyond) shall get an efficient early warning system to be on notice of new plannings of the group management.

== Systems ==
The DBH uses the same ERP system in all of its dependents but didn't conduct centralised purchasing up to now. Other than the competitor Thalia, so far the single dependents keep their origin firm's names. On the managements admission, the dependents shall keep their company profile as well.

Like the other huge German bookstore chains (Thalia and Mayersche) the DBH uses the capacities of logistics and central warehouse of the German book wholesaler Libri.
