= JWD =

JWD may refer to:

- Jayawijaya Dirgantara, the ICAO code JWD
- JWD InfoLogistics, the SET code JWD
- John W. Doull, Bookseller, a Canadian bookstore in Dartmouth, Nova Scotia
- British Army's Jungle Warfare Division, an overseas military training establishment of the British Army
