= Living Bookspace =

Independent bookstore in Hong Kong (est. 2016)

Coordinates: 22.444087°N 114.033830°E

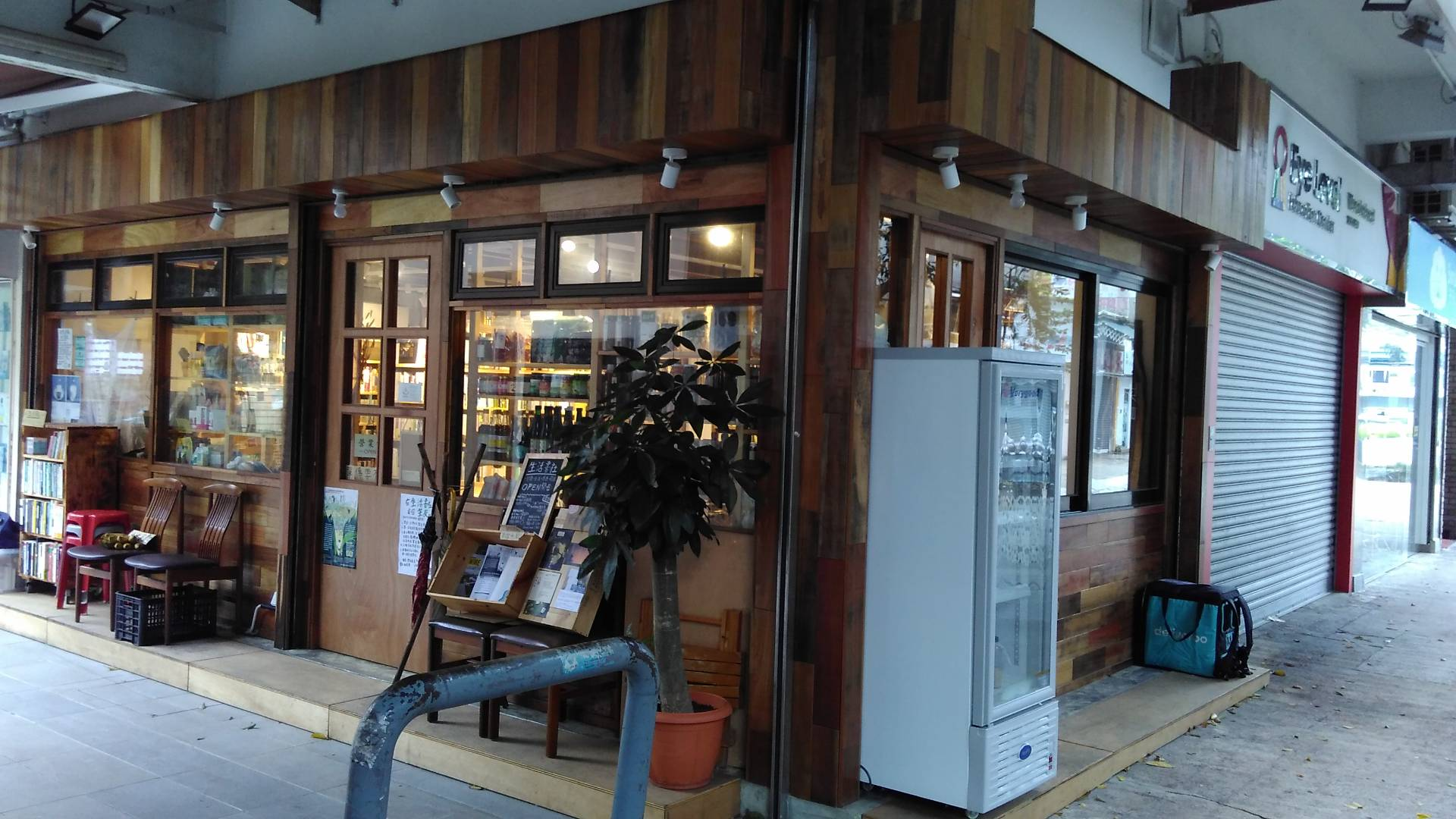
- Exterior of the current store
- Founded: July 8, 2016
- Founder: Eason Chung; Yip Wing-lam
- Headquarters: Hong Kong; Store S96, Tai Kiu Market, Yuen Long (From July 2016 - February 2018); Hong Kong; Shop 39, G/F, Shun Fung Building, 5–7 Fung Yau North Street, Yuen Long (From the end of April 2018 - May 2021)
- Products: Retail (used books, eco-friendly household goods)

Living Bookspace (Chinese: 生活书社; English: Living Bookspace) is an independent bookstore in Hong Kong, located at Shop 39, G/F, Shun Fung Building, 5–7 Fung Yau North Street, Yuen Long. It was founded in 2016 by social activists Eason Chung and Yip Wing-lam. The idea for establishing the bookstore originated from Yip Wing-lam’s observation of “rural-style bookstores” in Taiwan, where books are sold alongside various types of agricultural products. In 2015, they began working toward this concept, and many people generously donated second-hand books to support their operation.

The bookstore’s wooden bookshelves and stools are made from recycled materials. In addition to selling second-hand books, it also offers various types of lifestyle goods. The founders also bring second-hand books to different locations in Yuen Long to run temporary street stalls.

Between March 2018 and April 2019, the bookstore ranked first among Hong Kong independent bookstores in terms of online visibility in the Hong Kong and Macau regions. During the 2019 Anti-Extradition Law Amendment Bill Movement, they also showed concern and participated in several related protest activities.

== Shop features ==
As one of many independent bookstores in Hong Kong, Living Bookspace has several distinctive features, particularly in its materials and operating model.

The wooden bookshelves in its former location were made from recycled materials, including discarded wooden crates collected outside Tai Po Street Market, old wine boxes, and pallets. Due to the owners’ limited carpentry experience (despite consulting from the “Chi Kee Sawmill & Timber” in Kwu Tung), they were once criticized by passers-by during construction, and eventually had assistance from other stall owners. The wooden stools were also handmade by the founders at the same timber factory and continued to be used in the new location.

In addition to second-hand books (including some Taiwanese publications), the bookstore also sold various lifestyle goods, such as eco-friendly menstrual products and tea powder. Although some questioned whether these items were meant to supplement income, co-founder Yip Wing-lam explained that the goal was to introduce alternative choices within the bookstore space and challenge the idea that bookstores should only sell books.

=== Activities ===
In its early days at Tai Po Street Market, the bookstore occasionally brought second-hand books to different locations in Yuen Long to run pop-up stalls. They sold books using a “pay what you want” approach and interacted with local residents, sometimes inviting interested individuals to join them in running stalls.

In August 2018, the bookstore launched a pen-pal program titled “Write a Letter with Living Bookspace.” The bookstore itself served as a “mailbox.” When letters were received, wooden clips labeled with participants’ identification numbers were placed on a collection box to notify participants that they had mail. According to the founders, the program was initially created as an experimental activity, and while they expressed interest in continuing it, no fixed schedule was set.

== History ==
In 2014, while still a student at Lingnan University, Yip Wing-lam went on an exchange semester in Taiwan and discovered many “rural-style bookstores” that sold books alongside agricultural products. This experience inspired her to develop a similar concept in Hong Kong. Chung Yiu-wah, known as one of the “five student leaders” of the Hong Kong Federation of Students, supported her idea after hearing it. The two regarded it as a shared vision and hoped to contribute to the development of local industries (including agriculture) and sustainability in Hong Kong. They began preparing the project in 2015.

At that time, they considered renting a vacant shop in a market (Tuen Mun Tai Po Street Market), which offered low rent, and decided to proceed with this location.

However, Chung initially had doubts, believing there were other potential locations for a bookstore. Yip insisted that aside from the market, there were no viable “alternative choices.” After deciding to open in a market, they began preparations in stages: first, they used their personal networks to introduce their idea and invite donations of unwanted books; at the same time, they sourced various lifestyle goods and items they wished to sell. The final stage was shop renovation, which they believed did not need to be elaborate, but should match their lifestyle and expectations.

On 8 July 2016, the bookstore officially opened at Tai Kiu Market in Yuen Long, with a space of only about 30 square feet. The original location closed in February 2018, though they had already decided to continue operating without confirming a new site at that time. During this period, they also held activities encouraging customers to share their experiences with the owners.

The bookstore later relocated to Shop 39, Shun Fung Building, 5–7 Fung Yau North Street, Yuen Long, and resumed operations at the end of April 2018.

However, in April 2021, the bookstore announced on social media that due to lease expiration, the shop at Shun Fung Building would permanently close after 18 May 2021. Whether it would relocate again remained uncertain.

== Reputation and profile ==
Given that both Chung and Yip were prominent figures in social movements, they already had considerable recognition in student and activist circles. When they announced their bookstore concept, they received generous donations of second-hand books from supporters, which became a notable example within cultural and academic communities.

In recent years, as discussions around “anti–three major publishers” sentiment grew and Popular Bookstore closed their Hong Kong branches, public attention toward independent bookstores increased. Some media outlets began listing independent bookstores, including Living Bookspace, among recommended cultural destinations.

The bookstore also gained significant online visibility. According to data from a research institute, DailyView, between March 2018 and April 2019, Living Bookspace ranked first among Hong Kong independent bookstores in online presence in the Hong Kong and Macau region, slightly ahead of another independent bookstore, Hong Kong Reader Bookstore.

=== Philosophy and political stance ===
“Social movements are not separate from daily life. Besides simply asking office workers to pay attention to these issues, can we see life itself as social activism and emphasize action over text?”

— Yip Wing-lam, interview with Stand News

The owners regard the bookstore as a space where “life is social activism”, using books as a medium to explore possibilities for social change starting from a small shop in a market.

Since the outbreak of the 2019 Anti-Extradition Law Amendment Bill Movement, they have actively paid attention and participated in related protests. For example, on 12 June 2019, in response to the “Three Strikes” campaign, the bookstore suspended operations for one day. During the 2019 Hong Kong Book Fair, the so-called “Three major Chinese publishers” were still given prominent exhibition space, which led the bookstore to believe that the public should see materials that are “deliberately hidden from view” (referring to independent bookstores in Hong Kong and political books that cannot be distributed through the three major publishers).

== See also ==
- Hong Kong independent bookstores
