= SCGJWD Logistics =

Thai logistics company

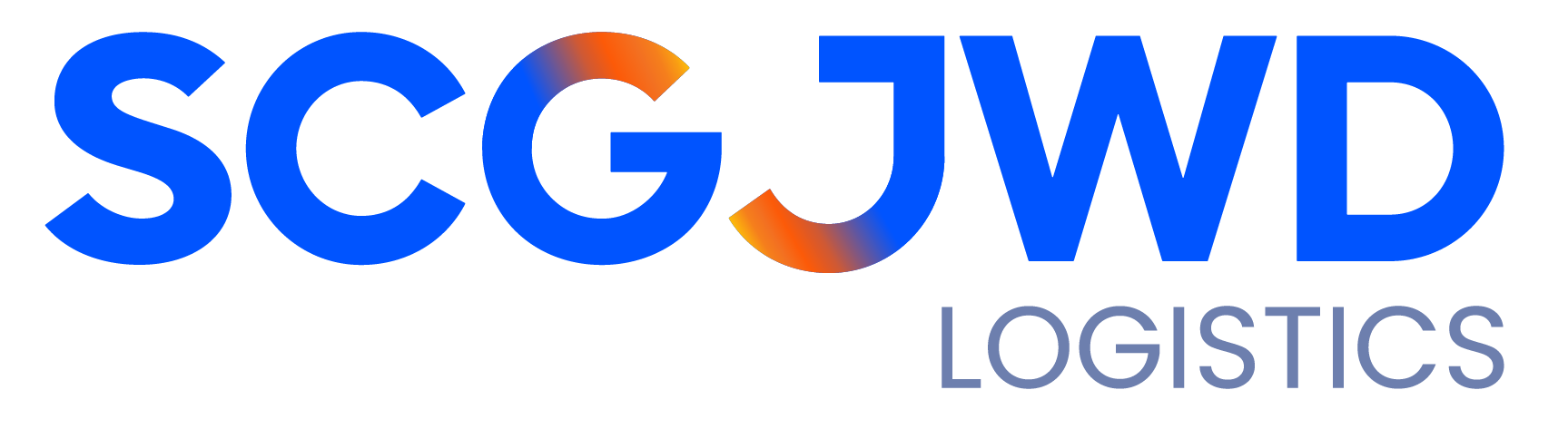
- Native name: เอสซีจีเจดับเบิ้ลยูดี โลจิสติกส์
- Company type: Public
- Traded as: SET: SJWD
- Founded: 1979
- Headquarters: Bangkok, Thailand
- Services: Logistics and Supply Chain Service (Thailand and 9 ASEAN countries)
- Number of employees: 4,120 (2024)
- Website: www.scgjwd.com

SCGJWD Logistics Public Company Limited (SCGJWD; SET: SJWD) was established through a partnership merger between SCG Logistics Management Co., Ltd. (SCGL), a subsidiary of Siam Cement Group, and JWD InfoLogistics (JWD). The share swap transaction was completed on February 14, 2023, and the trading symbol was changed to "SJWD" on February 17, 2023.

SCGJWD Logistics Public Company Limited is an integrated logistics service provider with expertise in industrial products, general goods, chemicals, automotive goods and cold chain storage.
