= Book City =

Book City may refer to:

== Companies ==
Bookstore chains in several countries are named Book City:

- Book City (Australia)
- Book City (Canada)
- Book City (China)
- Book City (Iran)

== Other uses ==
- Leipzig, a German city nicknamed Buch-Stadt ("Book City") for its historically large publishing industry
