= Ianos =

Ianos or IANOS may refer to:

- IANOS, a Greek bookstore chain
- Cyclone Ianos, a 2020 Mediterranean cyclone
- Ianos, Greek version of the god Janus

== People with the given name ==
- Ianoș Brînză (born 1998), Moldovan football player
- Ianos Kovacs (born 1945), Romanian boxer
