= Jongno Seojeok =

1907–2002 bookstore in Seoul, South Korea

- Hangul: 종로서적
- Hanja: 鐘路書籍
- RR: Jongno seojeok
- MR: Chongno sŏjŏk

Jongro Seojuk, or less known as Jongro Book Center, was the main center of book shopping in Seoul, Korea for many book fanatics over the decades. It opened in 1907 and declared bankruptcy in June 2002. Jongro Seojuk became a common rendezvous place.

== History ==
The book store was started by the Church of the Message of Christ, in 1907, who bought a timber-built tile-roof house, first started off by selling books relating to Christianity, over the years it changed its name from Kyomoon Seogwan, Jongro Seogwan and in 1963, by adopting the name "Jongro Seojuk Center", it became the leading bookstore of Seoul. Slowly over the 1990s, the 300 strong employee base dwindled to a meager 50, and finally in 2002, not being able to reverse its $11.5 million deficit, it declared bankruptcy. It apparently looked for a third party buyer, but no one came to their rescue.

It declared bankruptcy in June 2002, right in the middle of the 2002 FIFA World Cup. The reasons for its bankruptcy were rumored being for its lack of parking space, introduction of internet book stores, and general lack of customer service, the fact that one had climb through five different floors to look for a book, and its size. There were also those who criticized its sureness of its future, its reliance on old customers, and how it was run by people who believed that Jongro Seojuk would survive. There was no action in response to the expansion of the new Kyobo Moongo, which opened in 1981; it also did not try to change its image or store with the times. Marketing failed, and customer-company relationship had become nonexistent by the 1990s. It still managed to rake in a few loyal customers until the mid 1990s, but after 2000, Jongro Seojuk was overshadowed by the newer book stores in Jongro.

== See also ==
- List of bookstore chains
