= Queen Street station =

Queen Street station may refer to:

- Queen Street bus station, Brisbane, Queensland, Australia
- Queen Street light rail station, Gold Coast, Queensland, Australia
- Queen Street (Levin) railway station, New Zealand
- Cardiff Queen Street railway station, Wales, UK
- Glasgow Queen Street railway station, Scotland, UK
- Queen Street Station (Lancaster, Pennsylvania), a transit center in Lancaster, Pennsylvania, US

== See also ==
- Queen Street Bus Terminal, in Bugis, Singapore
- Queen station (Kitchener), a light rail station in Kitchener, Ontario, Canada
- Queen station (Toronto), a subway station in Toronto, Canada
- Queen Street (disambiguation)
