= BuchGourmet =

Independent bookstore in Cologne, Germany

BuchGourmet (1987–2013) was an independent bookstore in Cologne, Germany, and during this time the oldest and biggest bookstore in Germany that focused solely on culinary media.

The owner, Dieter Eckel, opened a 45 square meter store in 1987 after being inspired by a "tiny" cookbook store in Amsterdam. After a one-third expansion in 2009, the business occupied 120 square meters on Hohenzollernring with five employees. It was Germany's oldest and largest purely cooking book retailer.

BuchGourmet carried approximately 10,000 titles; Eckel orders between 500 and 1,000 new items a year, primarily from small and specialist presses, but at least one fifth of the stock consisted of used and antiquarian books. At least two fifths were in languages other than German. Eckel also maintained a search list of some 450 items. Almost three quarters of the store's sales were made online, approximately 60 percent to culinary professionals, including chefs, pastrycooks, and bartenders. It was called "a mecca for cooking fans, gourmets, foodies, cooking stars and cooking hobbyists".

Eckel was one of the founders of the International Association of Cookbook Stores.
