= Zyranna Zateli =

Greek novelist

Zyranna Zateli Ζυράννα Ζατέλη
- Born: 1951 (age 74–75); Sochos, Greece
- Occupation: novelist
- Writing career
- Period: 1984–present
- Notable awards: National Book Prize for Literature (1994, 2002)

Zyranna Zateli (Greek: Ζυράννα Ζατέλη) (born 1951) is a Greek novelist born in Sochos near Thessaloniki. She attended a drama school 1976–1979 and then worked as an actress and radio producer, before becoming a full-time writer.

== Awards ==
Both her novels were awarded with the National Book Prize for Literature 1994 and 2002 and they are translated into several European languages.

== Selected works ==
=== Novels ===
- Και με το φως του λύκου επανέρχονται (With the light of the Wolf, they return), 1993
- Με το παράξενο όνομα Ραμάνθις Ερέβους, Ο θάνατος ήρθε τελευταίος (Under the strange name of Ramanthis Erevous: Death came Last), 2001
- Με το παράξενο όνομα Ραμάνθις Ερέβους, Το πάθος χιλιάδες φορές (Under the strange name of Ramanthis Erevous: Passion thousands of times), 2009

=== Short fiction ===
- Περσινή αρραβωνιαστικιά (Last year's fiancée), 1984
- Στην ερημιά με χάρι (Graceful in the wilderness), 1986

=== Non-fiction ===
- O δικός της αέρας (Her Own Wind), 2005
- Οι μαγικές βέργες του αδελφού μου, 2006
