= IANOS =

IANOS SA is a Greek-based book, music and art retailer with several stores in the two major cities, Thessaloniki and Athens. It was named after the ancient Roman god Janus (a lower class god for beginnings, ends and dilemmas and making decisions) as a link to the identity and mission of the company. IANOS sells through its concept-store chain a large variety of books, CDs, art objects, periodicals, gifts and stationery. Also, it offers event venues, seminars, art galleries, a publishing house, and an art café. It operates web sales (for online shopping) and runs an internet radio.

== History ==
The first part of IANOS Culture Chain was created in September 1984 in Thessaloniki, Greece by Nikos Karatzas. The first store and headquarters of the group is located at 7 Aristotelous St. in Thessaloniki and is a 1,000-square-metre (11,000 sq ft) store including bookstore, art gallery and cultural events venue. Since then, the company has added another eight branches, with the last—opened in 2016—being IANOS for children (Mitropoleos 73, Thessaloniki). Furthermore, IANOS developed a range of new activities (IANOS Radio, IANOS Digital, IANOS Business Gifts). The branch on Stadiou street in Athens opened in 2005 and is a 1,600-square-metre (17,000 sq ft) store with more than 150,000 book titles. The average daily traffic is estimated at 1,500–2,000 people, which translates to at least 550,000 visitors per year. During the last three years of operation it hosted around 10,121 selected events that were attended by more than 200,000 spectators.

== Art shop ==
The Artshop concept store (Golden Hall, Athens), opened in 2008 and sells art books and objects from the most important museums and galleries around the world.

== Cultural events ==
In these 32 years, IANOS has hosted events, exhibitions, book presentations, concerts, discussions and happenings featuring many writers, philosophers, politicians, musicians, etc. Big names like Daniel Day-Lewis, Harry Markopoulos, Mikis Theodorakis, Eleni Karaindrou, Dionysis Savvopoulos, Antonio Gamoneda, Kostas Zouraris, Linda Papadopoulos, Eric-Emmanuel Schmitt, George Babiniotis, Jorge Bucay, Mimis Androulakis, Zyranna Zateli, Antonio Tabucchi, Amos Oz and many others have honored IANOS and presented their work. IANOS has also organized special events in memory of artists like Nikos Engonopoulos and Nikos Kazantzakis. During its operation, many important institutions have collaborated with IANOS for the organization of several cultural activities, such as Amnesty International, Greenpeace, Green Drinks, the British Council and many others; furthermore, IANOS has been present at various local cultural festivals, like the Thessaloniki Film Festival and the Athens Festival.

During the first 25 years (1984–2009), IANOS hosted about 2,273 events in total. 1,385 events were held at the Stadiou Street store in Athens during its 43 months of operation—that is an average of 32 events per month. A breakdown of the type of events held in Athens is as follows: 38% book presentations, 24% music concerts, 8% children's events, 8% special events, 6% press conferences, 5% public speeches and discussions, 5% art exhibitions/installations, and 7% were Hellenic Open University seminars, European Parliament days and performances. During the same period (1984–2009) the HQ store in Aristotelous Square, Thessaloniki hosted 888 events, of which 60% were book presentations, 15% art exhibitions, 9% children's events, 7% press conferences, 4% special events, and 5% were speeches, seminars and world days celebrations.

== Publications ==
IANOS Publications has published many Greek writers, poets and artists. IANOS also prints quarterly the literature magazine FILOLOGOS and has published 19 special themed annual calendars since 1993. The themes and topics of the publishing house include art, biographies, anthologies, collections, poetry, fiction, special editions, music books & CDs, non-fiction, and the city of Thessaloniki. Overall, IANOS publications comprise more than 170 books and every year, around 20 new titles are published.

== Finances ==
IANOS annual turnover has jumped from €4.5 million in 2003 to €13.1 million in 2009. It holds more than 13% of the total bookstores sales in Greece, and as of 2010 the total number of visits at the stores is estimated to be around 1 million per year. Currently, IANOS employs more than 100 people.

== See also ==
- List of museums in Greece

== Sources ==
- Special edition ‘IANOS 1984–2009’, IANOS publications, Sept 2009
- Various press releases throughout 1984–2010
- Various IANOS monthly events programs, IANOS publications, throughout 1984–2010
- Annual revenue review for 2009, IANOS, January 2010
- Interview with N.Karatzas, Karfitsa weekend,29/05/10
- Interview with N.Karatzas, To Kentri tis Makedonias, 17/04/10
- Interview with N.Karatzas, Exostis, 19/11/09
- Interview with N.Karatzas, Athens Voice 12–18/11/09, vol. 279
- Interview with N.Karatzas, Maison & Decoration, 25/10/09
- 25 years of IANOS, Epiloges, 7/12/08
- Article on e-orfeas.gr http://www.e-orfeas.gr/pressrelease/2196-pressrelease.html, retrieved 7/01/11
- Article on aggelioforos.gr https://web.archive.org/web/20111005083255/http://www.agelioforos.gr/default.asp?pid=7&ct=86&artid=72584 retrieved 7/01/11
- Article on in.gr http://entertainment.in.gr/html/ent/934/ent.97934.asp retrieved 7/01/11
- Article on N.Karatzas, enet.gr, 7–11/05/03
- Interview with N.Karatzas, on enet.gr, 20/11/09 http://www.enet.gr/?i=news.el.article&id=103194
- Article on IANOS, on lifo.gr, 15/11/07 http://www.lifo.gr/mag/features/312
- Article on IANOS, on enet.gr, 20/11/09 http://www.enet.gr/?i=news.el.article&id=103193
