= Comikaza =

Comic book store in Israel

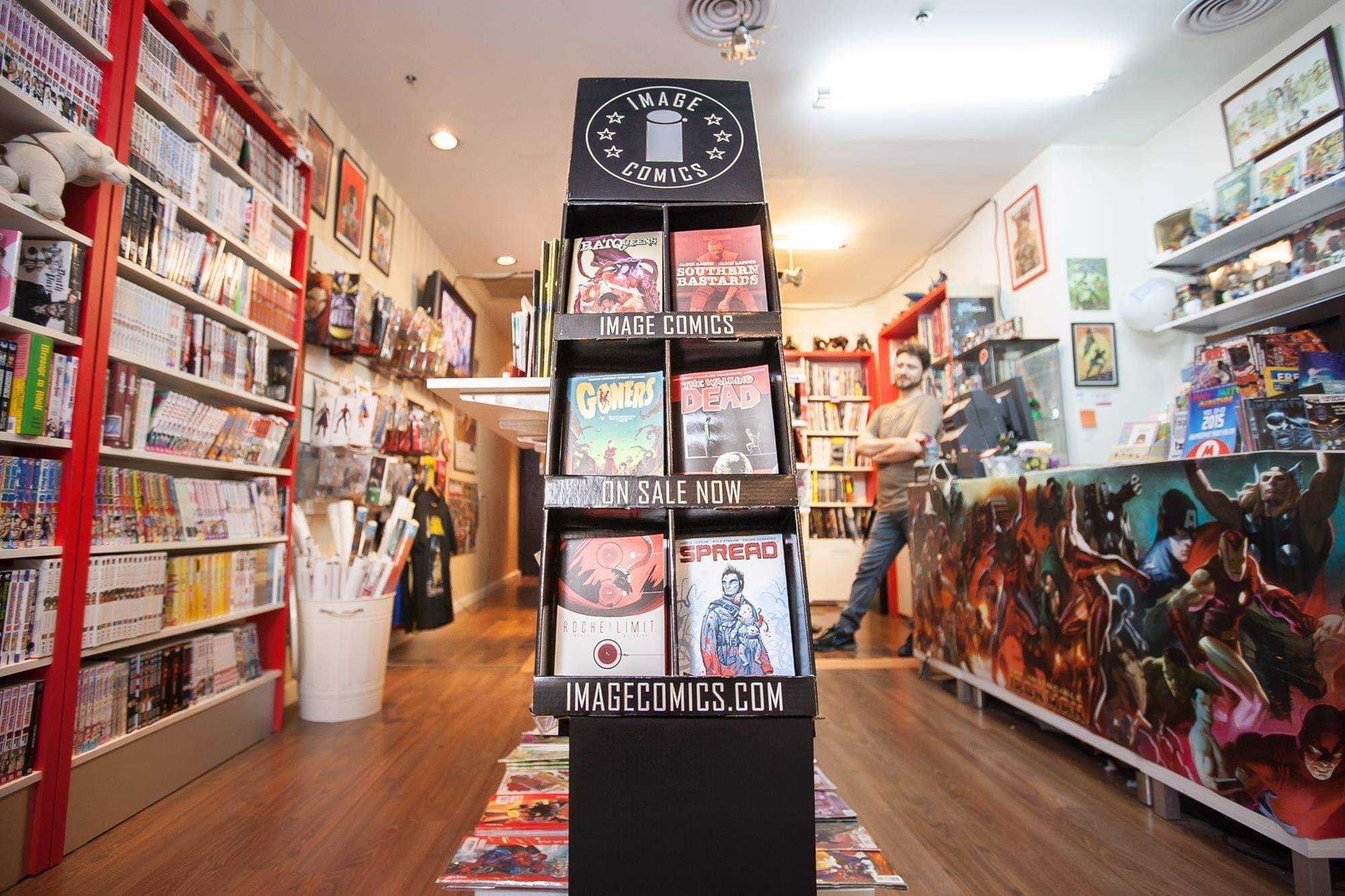
- Type: Private
- Founded: 2003
- Headquarters: Dizengoff Center, Tel Aviv, Israel
- Products: Comic books; Graphic novels; Manga

Comikaza is the first brick and mortar comic book store in Israel. In 2016 it was nominated for the Will Eisner Spirit of Comics Retailer Award.

== History ==
=== 2000s ===
The first branch of Comikaza opened on September 15, 2003, in Ramat Aviv neighborhood of Tel Aviv by Yossi and Ofra Konijn, a married couple. Prior to the establishment of a brick-and-mortar store, they operated an online forum and retailer under the domain name comics-net.com. When they realized there was demand, the idea of opening a physical store started taking shape.

On 5 August 2004, the store announced the release of the official Marvel-sanctioned Hebrew translation of Ultimate Spider-Man by Brian Michael Bendis and Mark Bagley, translated by David Chanoch published under the label "Comikaza Press". Comikaza released a total of 7 issues in Hebrew, collecting the first story arc of the title.

In 2005 the store relocated from Ramat Aviv to the Dizengoff Center mall in the center of Tel Aviv. Shortly thereafter, an additional store was opened in the mall named "Otaku" specializing in the sale of Japanese Manga, Anime and related paraphernalia. In 2013 the store temporarily shut down and was acquired by Jackob Sareli and Ori Ayalon, former customers, who have operated the store ever since under the branding Comikaza 2.0.

=== 2010s ===
In 2016 the store was nominated for the Will Eisner Spirit of Comics Retailer Award.

The store held signing events with comics creators Neil Gaiman in 2006 and Chip Zdarsky in 2016. Every May it celebrates Free Comic Book Day (FCBD), giving away free comic books for a period of six hours. FCBD is usually held on Fridays in Israel rather than the usual Saturday due to the Shabbath. In 2014 and 2019 the store was nominated for The Diamond Retailer Best Practices Awards for its work on FCBD. The store hosts a comic book reading book club among its customers and has hosted several geek-culture related trivia, auctions, and standup comedy nights.

In 2018 a Haifa branch was opened, managed by local comics artist Vladik Sandler. This branch shut down at the end of 2019.
