= Dokya =

- Native name: ดอกหญ้า
- Company type: Private
- Industry: Retail; Publishing
- Founded: 1981; 45 years ago
- Defunct: 2006 (original company)
- Fate: Bankruptcy; Brand acquired by Dokya eBook Co., Ltd.
- Number of locations: 2 (privately owned, franchised)
- Products: Books; Magazines

Dokya (Thai: ดอกหญ้า, pronounced [dɔ̀ːk.jâː]) is a Thai Bookstore chain and book publisher. Formerly based in Bangkok, it was one of the largest bookstore chains in Thailand in the 1990s but entered a period of significant decline after the early 2000s. Following financial difficulties and bankruptcy, the chain downsized significantly, with only a small number of franchise branches remaining in operation.

Dokya was established as Samakkhisan (Dokya) Co., Ltd. in 1981, and originally operated a single bookshop at Tha Phrachan, near Thammasat University. It was very successful, and established secondary branches, one of the first booksellers in the country to do so. Dokya, which also operated as a publisher, rapidly grew into one of the largest bookstore chains in the country in the 1990s, and went public in 1995. It expanded into book imports, and also considered branching into film. In addition to its own branches, it established a franchise system, with over 60 franchisees.

However, the business sharply declined afterwards, partly due to management issues that resulted in illiquidity causing Dokya to miss payments to publishers, damaging its credit. Samakkhisan (Dokya) PCL was declared bankrupt in 2006 and liquidated, though the business continued to operate under other entities. Most of Dokya's stores subsequently closed down, especially following political unrest in 2010 and major flooding in 2011, which cost it over 60 million baht (US$2M) in damages from which it was unable to recover. Its Victory Monument store was destroyed by fire in riots during the 2010 Thai military crackdown, and its popular Siam Square store closed down in 2017. The original Tha Phrachan store, the last self-operated branch, ceased operations in 2019, leaving only two franchise branches, in Buriram and Chonburi.

In November 2023, a separate company, Dokya eBook Co., Ltd., announced that it had acquired the Dokya brand name and planned to relaunch it as an online Ebook platform. The project was scheduled to launch at the 52nd National Book Fair in March 2024, but the company’s Chief executive officer resigned in February citing disagreements over business direction, and the company later announced a temporary suspension of operations to restructure.

Dokya also operated overseas branches in the United States at Thai Town and Chinatown in Los Angeles, which closed down in 2021.
