= Archambault =

Canadian music retailer

Groupe Archambault
- Company type: Subsidiary
- Industry: Retail
- Founded: 1896; 130 years ago
- Founder: Edmond Archambault
- Headquarters: Montreal, Quebec, Canada
- Number of locations: 13
- Products: Books, magazines, sheet music
- Parent: Quebecor (1995–2015); Renaud-Bray (2015–present)
- Website: archambault.ca

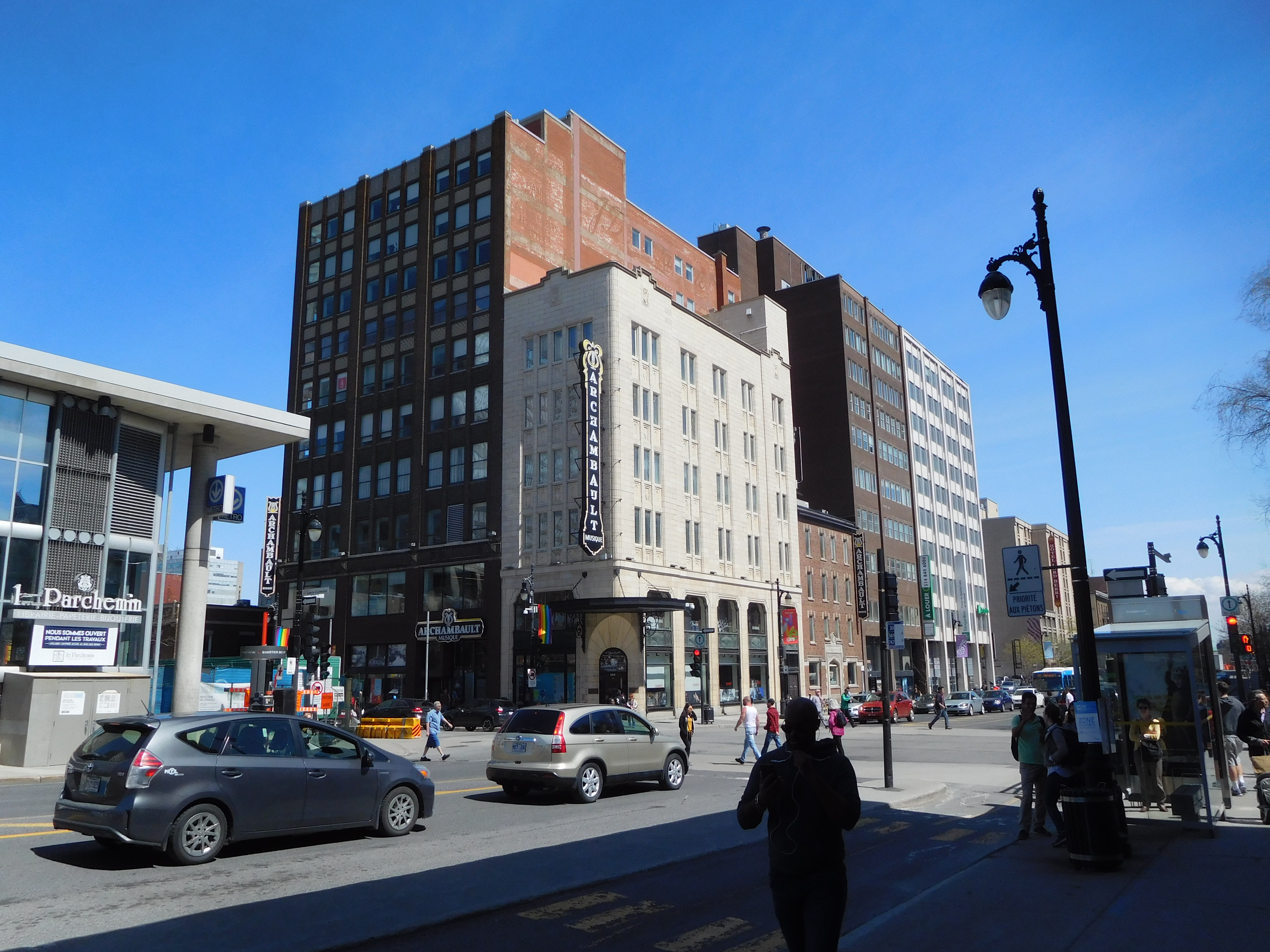
Flagship store spread on several buildings, corner Berri and Sainte-Catherine in Downtown Montreal, before the 2018 downsizing.

Archambault (French pronunciation: [aʁʃɑ̃bo]) is the largest music retailer in the province of Quebec, Canada, as well as a major retailer of books, DVDs, periodicals, musical instruments, sheet music, games, toys and gift ideas. Its e-commerce site, www.archambault.ca, is the largest French-language retail site in North America. Archambault currently operates 13 stores in Quebec.

Paragraphe Bookstore, an English-language bookstore, is also part of Archambault Group.

== History ==
Archambault was founded in 1896 by Edmond Archambault, who had originally wanted to open a sheet music store. In partnership with J.A. Hurteau, a major retailer of pianos, instruments and music accessories, Mr. Archambault opened his first store on the corner of Saint Denis and Sainte Catherine Streets in Montreal. In 1919, Edmond Archambault became the store's sole owner, and in 1930, he decided to move to the corner of Berri and Sainte Catherine Streets, where he built a seven-storey building, which he dubbed the "House of the Future" and served as the home of Archambault Group's main office.

Mr. Archambault died in 1947 and nephews, Rosaire Sr. and Edmond Sr., took over the reins of the business. In the 1980s, the son of Rosaire Sr., Rosaire Jr., became president. Then began a period of expansion during which many new Archambault stores opened across Quebec. 1984 saw also the creation of Distribution Select, the largest distributor of music in Quebec.

Archambault logo until 2001

Archambault logo from 2001 to 2012

The Archambault family sold the family-owned company to Quebecor in 1995. Rosaire Archambault Jr. was kept on as president of the Quebecor subsidiary Archambault Group Inc. until his retirement in 2000 when he was replaced by Natalie Larivière.

Camelot-Info, a computer bookstore, was acquired by Archambault in 2000. Started in 1978, at its peak, Camelot-Info had six stores and an online shopping site, with 10,000 titles in its inventory. By 2007, however, in face of competition from large chain stores and the Internet, only the original flagship Phillips Square store remained. Camelot-Info's last store closed in January 2009.

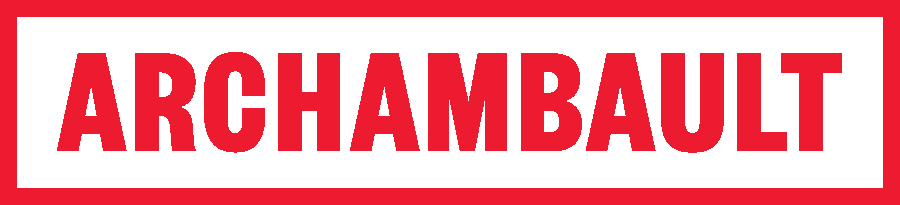
Archambault logo from 2012 to 2017

On May 19, 2015, Quebecor announced the sale of 14 stores Archambault and the single store Paragraph Anglophone bookstore to Renaud-Bray Group. The sale of the retail stores was completed in September 2015.

For decades, the flagship store of Archambault was located at 500 Saint Catherine Street East. It extended on adjacent infrastructures at 510 Saint Catherine Street East and 1275 Berri Streets, forming one big store that allowed customers to go from one interconnected building to another without the need to go outside. In February 2018, the total size of the flagship store was reduced by almost 25 percent due to decrease in sales attributed to the rise of e-commerce. Among the portion of the store that was shut down was the historic 500 Saint Catherine East building that had been home to Archambault since 1930. The store remained open at 510 Saint Catherine Street East and on Berri Street as well as on the upper floors of the 500 Saint Catherine building itself. Despite having sold the retail chain to Renaud Bray in 2015, Quebecor had remained owner of the building and took the occasion to move its online radio station QUB to the space vacated by Archambault. On November 27, 2018, the iconic Archambault signage was removed from the building, a move that drew so much criticism that it was reinstated nine months later. In late June 2023, the rest of the Saint Catherine Street/Berri store was finally closed. The Archambault signage remains.
