= Scorpio Books =

Bookstore in Christchurch, New Zealand

Coordinates: 43.532°S 172.635°E

- Main store in 2026
- Established: 1976
- Type: Bookstore
- Website: scorpiobooks.co.nz

Scorpio Books is an independent bookstore in Christchurch, New Zealand. It was founded in 1976 by David Cameron, who changed the name of Pisces Books to match his and his wife Jane's astrological sign. Scorpio Books is one of the longest-running independent bookstores in New Zealand.

== History ==
David Cameron, founder of Scorpio Books, was born in Dunedin in 1948. An avid reader, he started an after-school job at the University Book Shop a few weeks before his 17th birthday, working under manager John Griffin. He left school in 1965 to work there full time. In 1974, after he had risen to acting manager of the shop at the age of 24, he moved to Christchurch and worked for the University Book Shop at the University of Canterbury ordering textbooks. As a young man who had not been in business before, and associated with a university, Cameron had difficulty finding premises to open his own bookstore, with one landlord assuming his customers would be prone to "peeing in the doorway". After a year, his wife Jane heard from her hairdresser that the small specialist bookstore Pisces Bookshop was for sale, and in 1976 Cameron bought it.

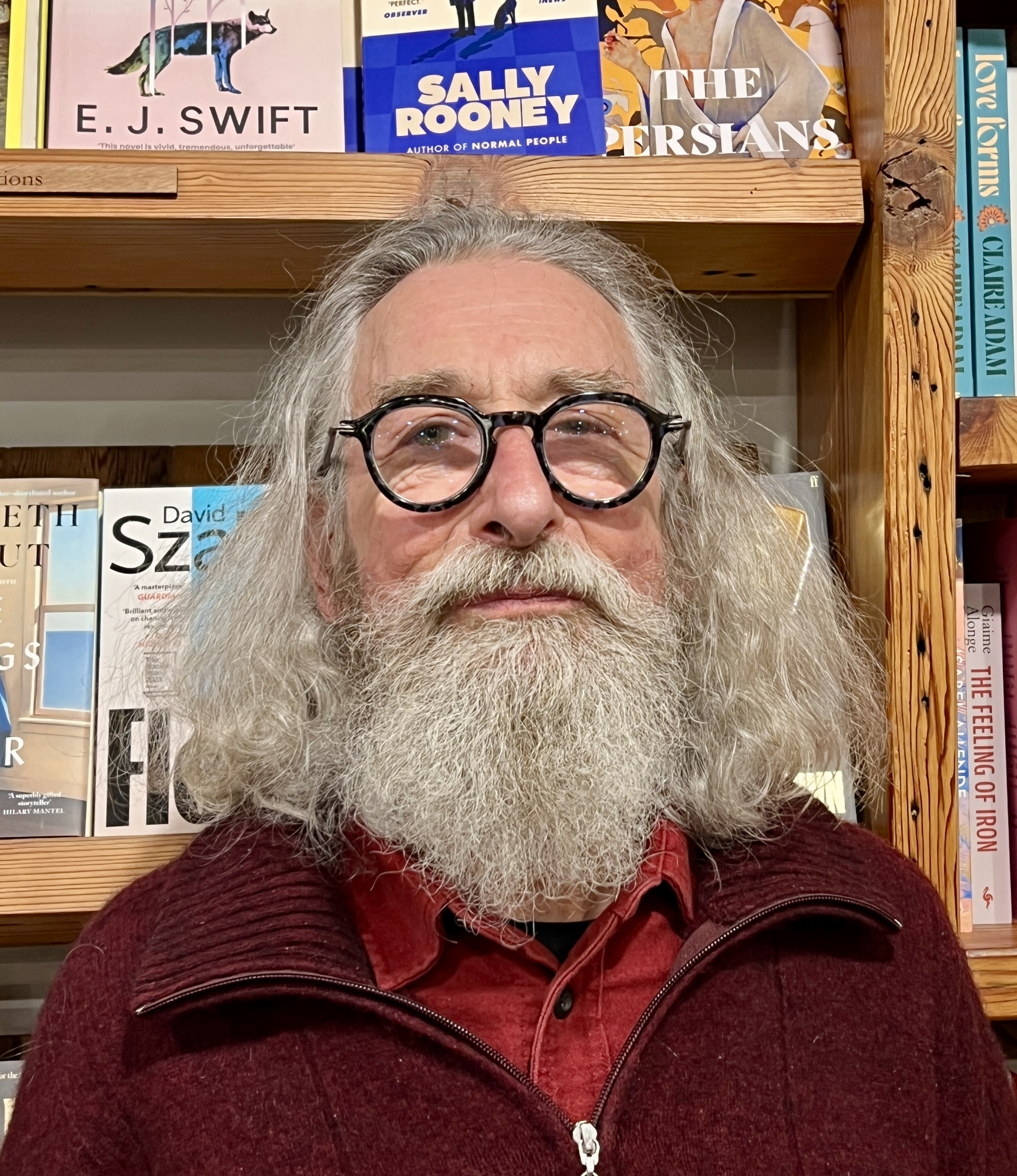
David Cameron, founder

Pisces Bookshop was near the university's Ilam campus, at 203 Fendalton Road on the corner of Clyde Road. It was started by Val Minifie, who had worked for three years for the counterculture bookseller and publisher Watkins Books and returned to New Zealand in the early 1970s. She opened Pisces in October 1972 with her husband, naming it after her astrological birth sign. The shop opened in the afternoons five days a week and stocked mostly New Age, occult, and spiritualist literature—"from Acupuncture to Zen". After having her second child Minifie sold the business to Cameron and his wife and became a book distributor.

In 1979 Cameron moved the bookshop to Phoenix House, on the corner of Oxford Terrace and Hereford Street, and renamed it Scorpio Books after his and his wife's astrological sign. It opened on that site on Monday 12 February 1979. The stock was unconventional, encompassing Eastern religion, tarot, palmistry, UFOs, Montessori education, organic gardening, self-sufficiency, reincarnation, dreams, and yoga. A noticeboard in the shop advertised spiritual and religious meetings, astrology courses, and discussion groups.

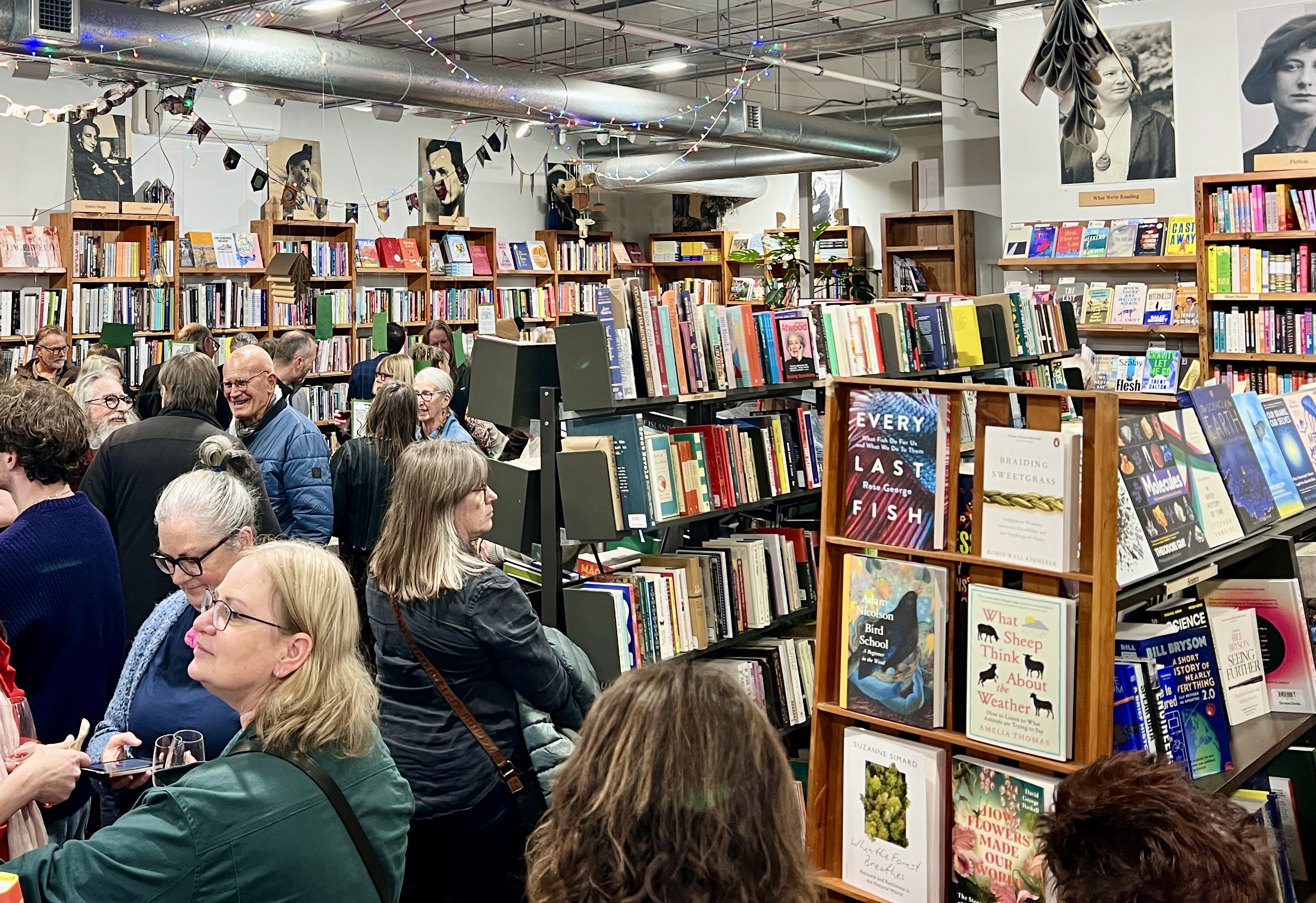
50th anniversary celebration, 28 May 2026

Cameron was opposed to censorship, and Scorpio Books stocked controversial publications, including a selection of books on queer topics well before New Zealand's homosexual law reform decriminalised gay sex in 1986. Several titles on cannabis cultivation were reported by an undercover police officer, and the books were eventually banned by the Indecent Publications Tribunal, although Scorpio was not prosecuted for selling them. Another book on euthanasia was banned by the Tribunal in 1992, and cleared for sale after nine months; Scorpio was the only bookstore to immediately stock copies. It also stocked Madonna's book Sex in 1992 when chain bookstores refused.

In 1988 Scorpio became the first New Zealand bookstore to move from a card catalogue and computerise its inventory, which required a two-hour nightly backup onto 30 floppy disks.

By 2013 Scorpio claimed it stocked the largest range of science fiction books in New Zealand. Writer and journalist Steve Braunias in 2022 described Scorpio as "just about the classiest bookstore in either island". In 2026 Scorpio Books celebrated its 50th anniversary, with David Cameron thought to be New Zealand’s longest-serving independent bookshop owner still actively working. Cameron was awarded a Lifetime Achievement Award at the 2026 Aotearoa Book Industry Awards.

== Premises ==
In 1979 Scorpio Books was the first business to open in Phoenix House, originally occupying 90 m^{2} (970 ft^{2}) of floor space, twice the area of Pisces Books, and gradually expanding into neighbouring premises. The move to a larger space allowed an increase in less esoteric stock, including science fiction. Over half the books sold were imported paperbacks, mostly from the United States, rather than hardbacks printed in New Zealand or Britain—a novelty at the time.

Scorpio remained in Phoenix House for 18 years, but a rent bidding war with the corporate landlord forced them to move on 13 January 1997 to new premises nearby at 79 Hereford Street, where they remained until the Christchurch earthquakes. The September 2010 quake closed the shop for three days, but the 22 February 2011 quake shook 2000 books off the shelves and rendered the building unsafe. Staff were not able to re-enter until 11 May, when they packed up 18,000 books, some damaged by damp and dust. These were moved to new premises which had opened in April at 113 Riccarton Road, near Westfield Mall.

When the Re:START container mall was set up, Scorpio was invited to operate a second shop there in a 55 m² shipping container. This central city shop opened on 29 October 2011 and stayed until 2016, reopening on Friday 19 February 2016 in Five Lanes, in the new BNZ Centre at 120 Hereford Street. Scorpio was one of the first tenants, in premises six times the size of those in the container mall, chosen because they faced south and protected the books from sunlight. At that time a staff of 14 operated the two shops; Scorpio consolidated its Riccarton shop into the BNZ Centre in March 2017.

Cameron's partner Jo Hewitson, who left a career in early childhood education to become co-owner, built the main store shelving from recycled earthquake timber, salvaged from the old Odeon Theatre and a demolished coolstore. In its Five Lanes site Scorpio went on to establish three separate shops, eventually employing 31 people: as well as its main location, and an outlet selling travel and natural history books (Scorpio Books Next Door), in September 2021 it opened the children's bookshop Telling Tales.

BNZ Centre stores

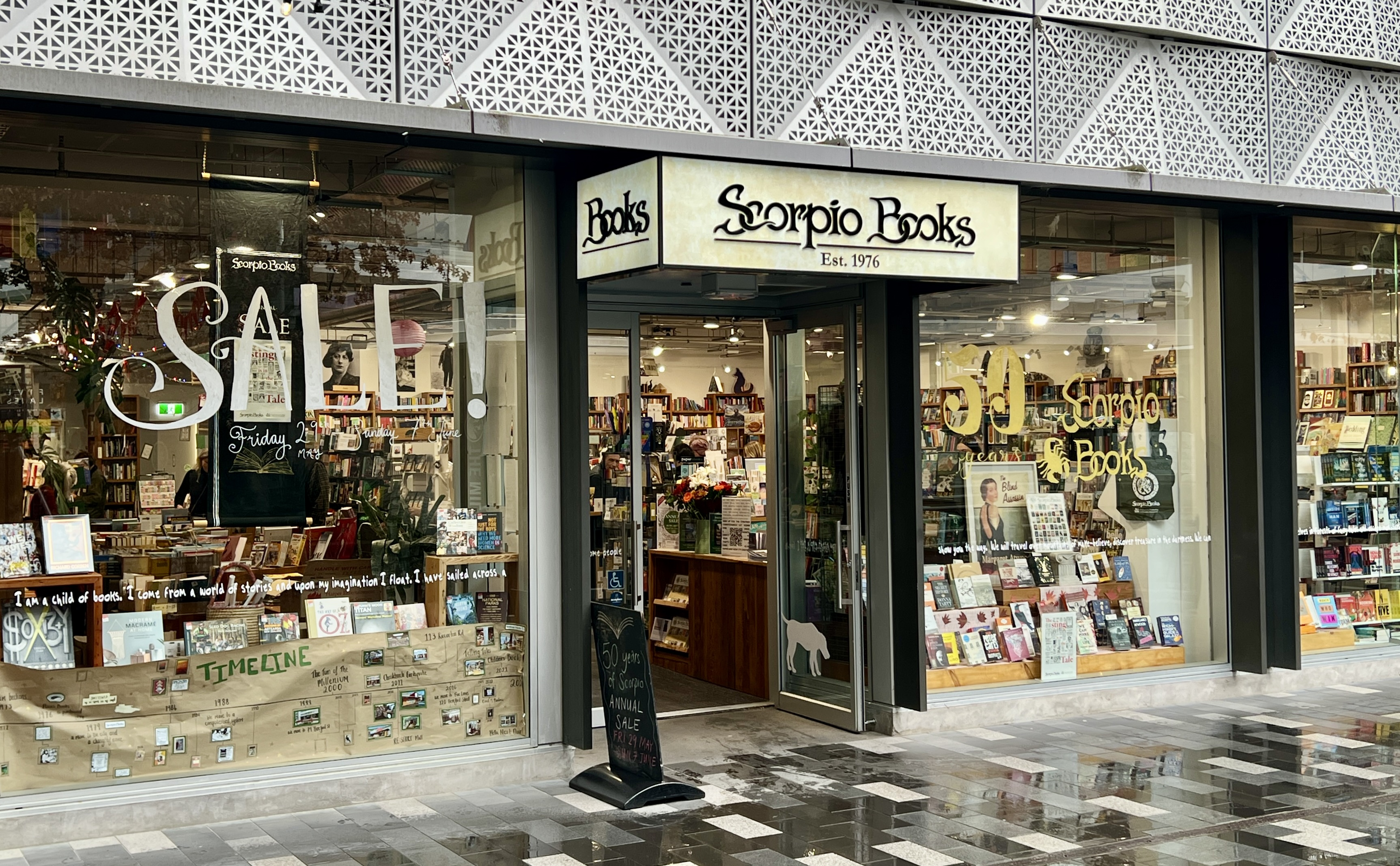
Main store

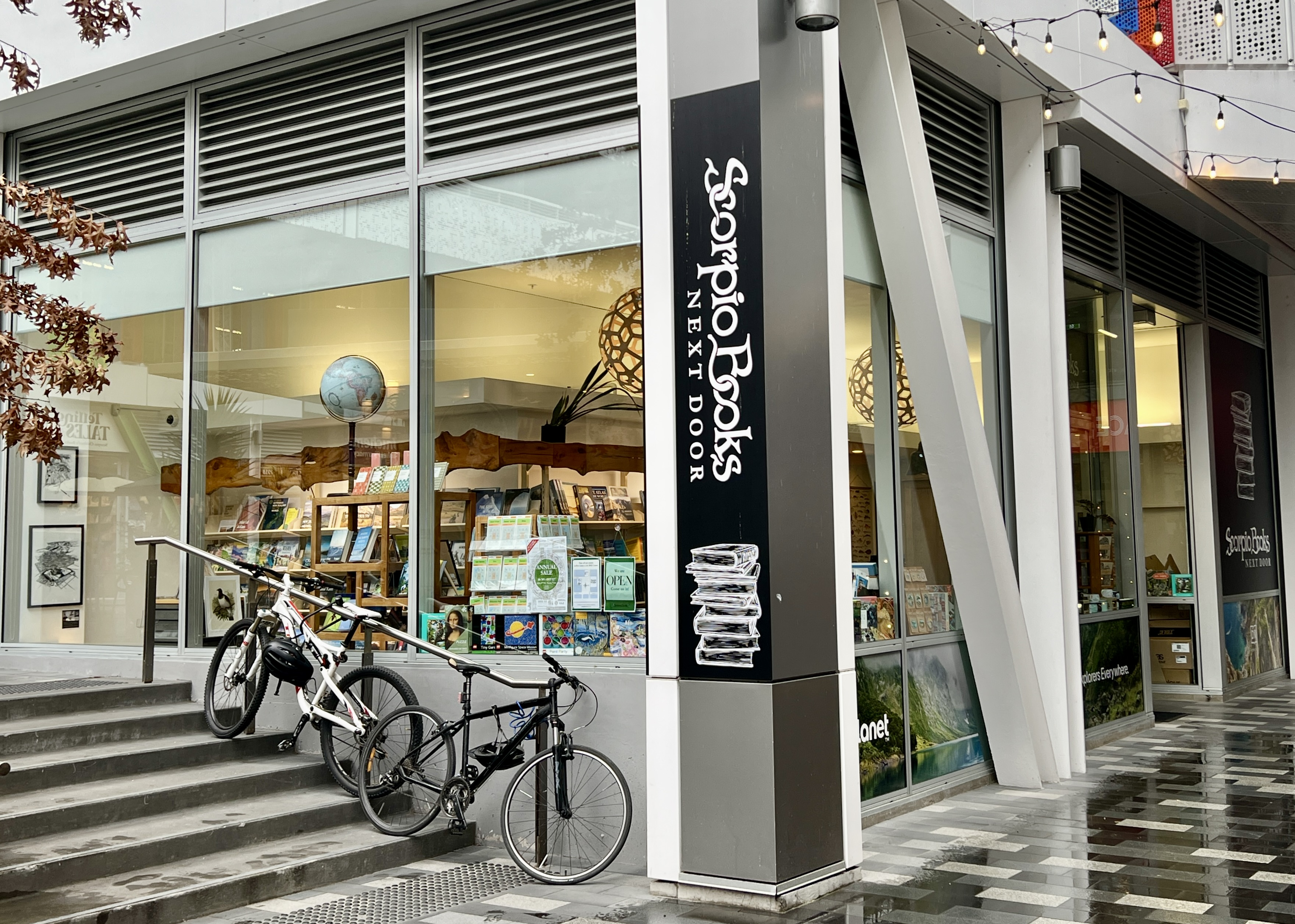
Scorpio Books Next Door

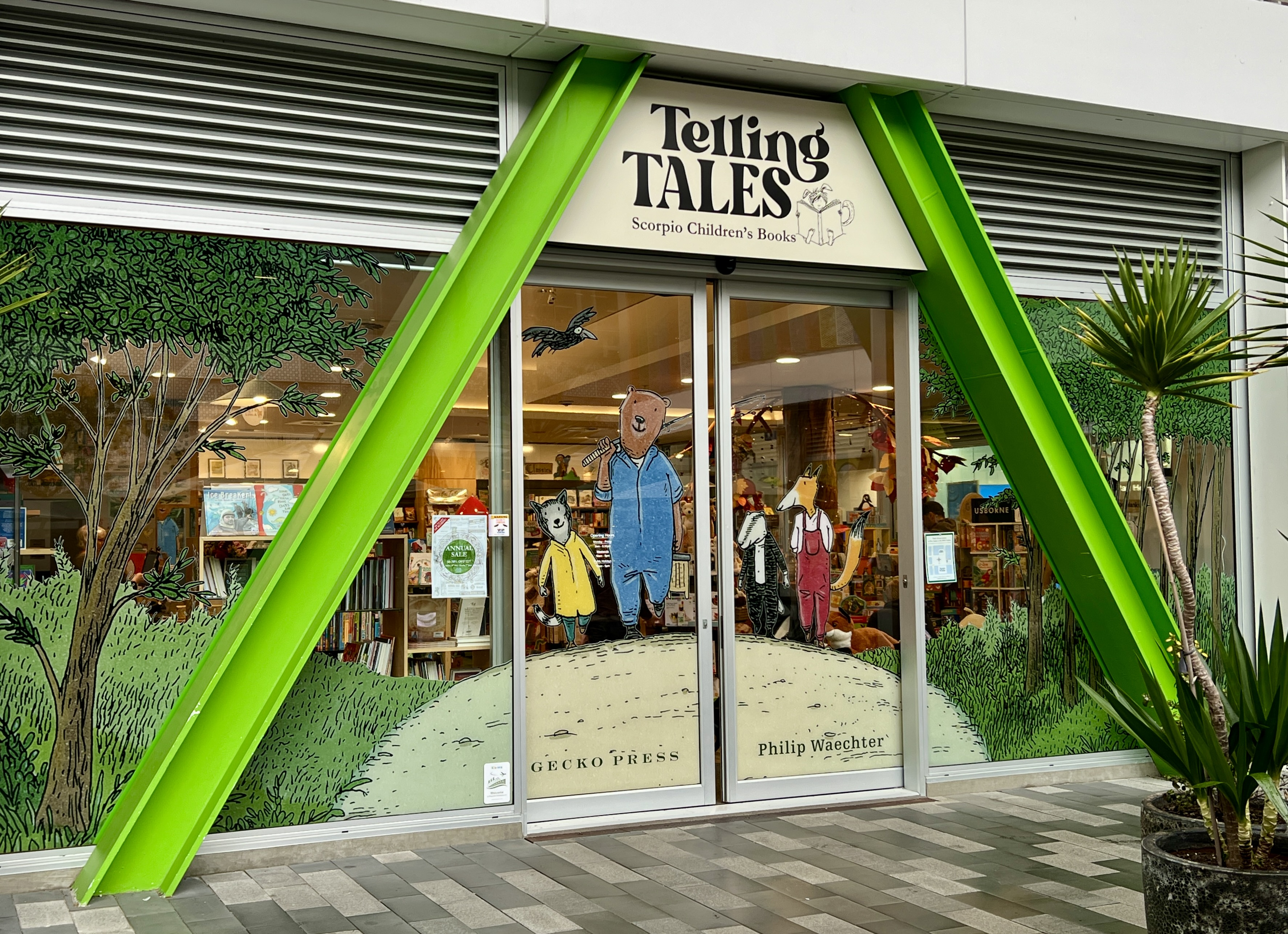
Telling Tales
