= The Book Room =

Former bookstore in Halifax, Nova Scotia

The Book Room was an independent bookstore located on Barrington Street in downtown Halifax, Nova Scotia. Founded in 1839 (186 years ago), at the time of its closing in March 2008 (17 years ago), The Book Room was Canada’s oldest bookstore (169 years), and the largest non-chain bookstore in Eastern Canada. The shop acted as an important cultural centre for the local book community, offering support for local authors.

When announcing The Book Room’s imminent demise, its president, Charles Burchell, noted that the shop had "survived two World Wars, the Great Depression and economic ups and downs over its 169 year history", only to be shuttered by retail and economic shifts including online ordering and dual pricing schemes which render books more expensive in Canada than in the USA.

== See also ==
- John W. Doull, Bookseller
