= Al-Jahith's Treasury =

Bookstores in Amman, Jordan

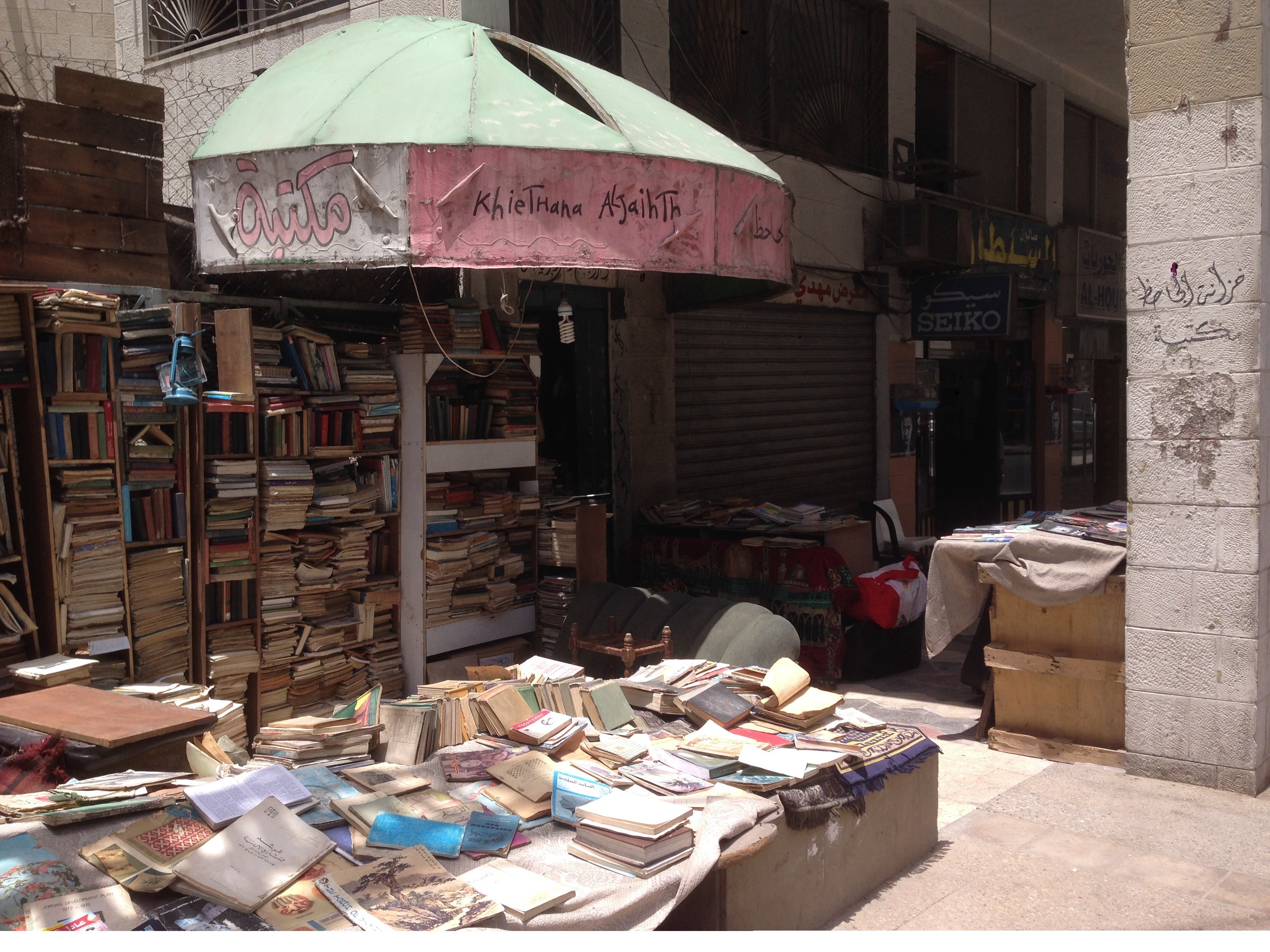
The Nymphaeum branch of al-Jahith's Treasury (also known as Mahall al-Maa), owned and operated by Hamzeh Al-Maaytah.

Al-Jahith's Treasury or Khizanat al-Jahith (Arabic: خزانة الجاحظ) is the collective name for three bookstores in downtown Amman, Jordan, owned by three brothers of the al-Maaytah (Arabic: المعايطة) family of Karak. Four successive generations of this family have operated the bookstore nearly continuously from the last decade of the nineteenth century to the present day, migrating between Karak, Jerusalem, and Amman.

The archives of the bookstore are notable for their Arabic religious, scientific and literary manuscripts, the oldest of which dates back to the thirteenth century. In addition, there are newspaper and journal editions from the early 1900s, as well as thousands of rare books that the family obtained at auction from the offices of the British Mandate in Palestine in 1947.

Al-Jahith's Treasury was the first bookstore established by a decree of Abdullah I, issued in Qatraneh in 1921 in the course of his consolidation of power leading to his assumption of the Emirate of Transjordan later that year. When Al-Jahith's Treasury moved from Jerusalem to Amman after the 1947–48 war, it became the first lending library in the burgeoning capital city. It remains unique among the bookstores of Amman with its philanthropic mission of accessibility to the poor and lower classes: any book can be exchanged for any other, or rented for one month for one Jordanian dinar.

== Name ==
The bookstore's name is a reference to the renowned Abbasid writer and theologian, al-Jahith (Arabic: الجاحظ) and to the fact that the residents of Jerusalem took note of the bulging eyes (Arabic: جحوظ) of Mamduh al-Maaytah (the father of the brothers of the present generation).

An alternative account is that the grandfather Khalil's overflowing Jerusalem warehouse was frequently compared to that of the original al-Jahith, who, according to legend, perished when his precariously stacked books fell onto his head.

== History ==
The bookselling profession has passed from father to son in the al-Maaytah family for four generations since the Ottoman period. The bookstore's physical location has moved dozens of times due to the migrations of the family and the upheavals of war. The history of al-Jahith's Treasury, known largely from oral traditions of the Al-Maaytah family and of the inhabitants of Amman, can be divided into four distinct periods. In the first generation, Salman al-Maaytah founded the bookstore, and with him it moved between Karak and Jerusalem, with some stints in Nablus and Hebron. In the second generation, Salman's son Khalil al-Maaytah ran the bookstore in the Old City of Jerusalem from 1922 until his death in 1947. In the third generation, Khalil's son Mamduh al-Maaytah transferred the bookstore from Jerusalem to Amman in 1948, where it became the city's first lending library and a hub of cultural activity. When Mamduh died in 1993, three of his seven sons—Hisham, Hamzeh, and Muhammad—followed in his footsteps and have continued to operate the bookstore. Today, each of the brothers runs a different branch in downtown Amman.

=== Karak and early British-Administered Jerusalem (ca. 1890–1921) ===
The great-grandfather of the present generation was Salman al-Maaytah al-Tamimi. Himself belonging to a lineage of scribes and book traders, he is credited with founding the first incarnation of what would become al-Jahith's Treasury in Karak in the 1890s, where it was known as Maṣṭabat al-Karak (the Gathering-Place of Karak). In those days, he would migrate with the rest of the al-Maaytah clan between Karak, Jerusalem, Nablus, and Hebron. He brought his books with him on these migrations, and he eventually settled in Jerusalem, where the bookstore became known as Maktabat Ḥā'iṭ al-Burāq (Bookstore of the Wall of Buraq) due to its location near the Wall of Buraq. Salman's son Khalil, who fought in the Great Arab Revolt during World War I, inherited the trade when his father died.

=== Mandatory Palestine (1921–1947) ===
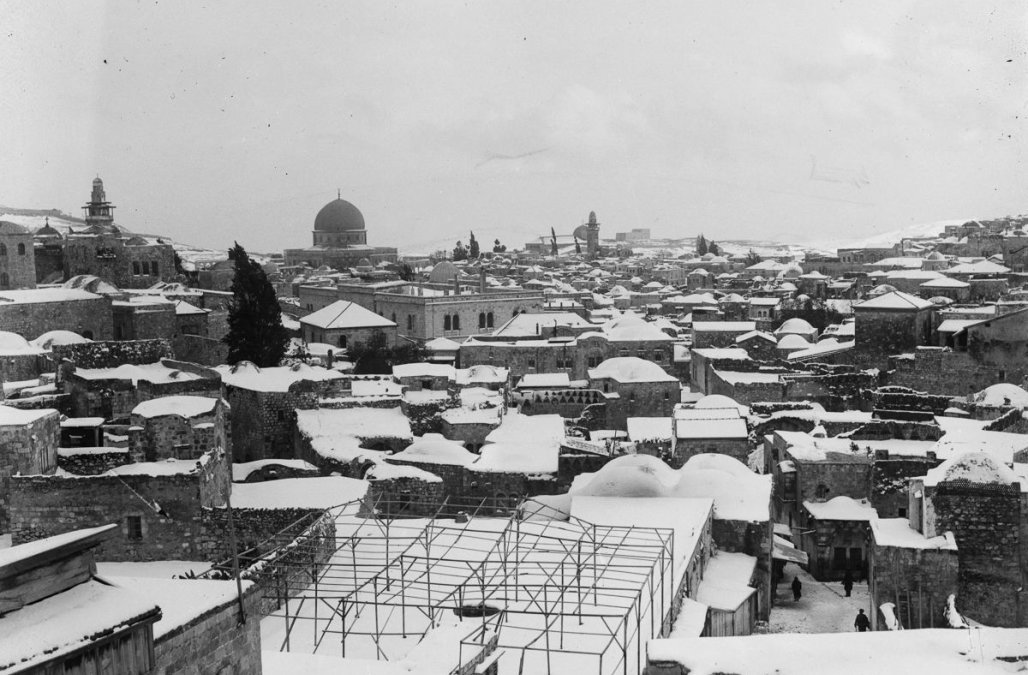
Jerusalem rooftops after the rare snowstorm of 1921. According to al-Maaytah family tradition, Khalil re-established the bookstore in Jerusalem in one of the snowiest winters in recent memory.

In early 1921, Khalil and his maternal uncle were among the sheikhs of Karak who pledged their loyalty to Abdullah I at Qatraneh, on his way from Ma'an to Amman. It was in Qatraneh at this time that Abdullah I issued a royal license for the establishment of a bookstore in the Emirate. That same winter, Khalil re-established the bookstore in the Old City of Jerusalem. It was located near the Damascus Gate, and it was known as Ṣā' Khalīl al-Raḥmān, or the "Chamber of Abraham", based on the patriarch's Qur'anic epithet as the beloved friend (Khalīl) of God (al-Raḥmān).

Khalil continued in the antiquarian book trade for the next 25 years, most notably acquiring thousands of rare books and manuscripts from the offices of the British Mandate shortly before its disintegration in 1947. Throughout this period, his store became a center of Sufi life in Jerusalem.

When hostilities broke out in the 1947–48 Civil War in Mandatory Palestine, the bookstore was burnt in its entirety, and the only books and manuscripts that survived were those that Khalil had stored in his home instead of the bookstore—including the lion's share of the British Mandate material. As a militia volunteer, Khalil was killed in a battle between Arab and Jewish forces near al-Eizariya in 1947.

=== Establishment in Amman (1948–1993) ===
Khalil's son Mamduh was born in Karak in 1930 and attended school through sixth grade before becoming an apprentice to his father. Later, he would become an autodidact, teaching himself English and Turkish and acquiring a name as a respected poet.

He entered the Jordanian military and fought in the 1948 Arab–Israeli War. He was wounded in a land mine explosion in the vicinity of Qalandia and as a consequence his leg had to be amputated. He moved briefly to Beirut for his convalescence.

In 1948, Mamduh returned to Amman with the books that he had inherited. Like his father before him, he took advantage of King Abdullah I's royal licence for the Al-Maaytah family to set up a bookstore. At that time, there was no public library system in Jordan. From the beginning, Mamduh saw the mission of al-Jahith's Treasury to be the free spread of knowledge, even among those who could not afford to buy books, so he turned the store into a lending library and advertised it as such. Any book could be borrowed for a month for a token sum, and any book could be exchanged for another.

Al-Jahith's Treasury went through a series of peregrinations due to economic pressures and orders from the municipality. The first location was near the Yemeni market; from there, Mamduh moved to the vicinity of the Arab Bank next to Abu Seer Sweets; from there, he moved to a location abutting the Roman Nymphaeum (where Hamzeh's branch remains to this day), and, finally, he set up a kiosk on the corner of Basman Street, across from the Central Post Office and Hashim Restaurant (where Hisham's branch remains to this day). Both in Mamduh's tenure and in recent years, the municipality and developers have attempted to shut down the store but failed in the face of public outcry.

Mamduh developed connections between Al-Jahith's Treasury and the University of Jordan and Al al-Bayt University, which have benefited from the loan of rare manuscripts from the Al-Maaytahs, for the purpose of research, display in exhibits, and editing for publication.

Mamduh Al-Maaytah died in 1993 and bequeathed the bookstore to his seven children, three of whom—Hisham, Hamzeh, and Muhammad—have continued in his footsteps and carried on the legacy of Al-Jahith's Treasury.

=== The Current Generation (1993–present) ===
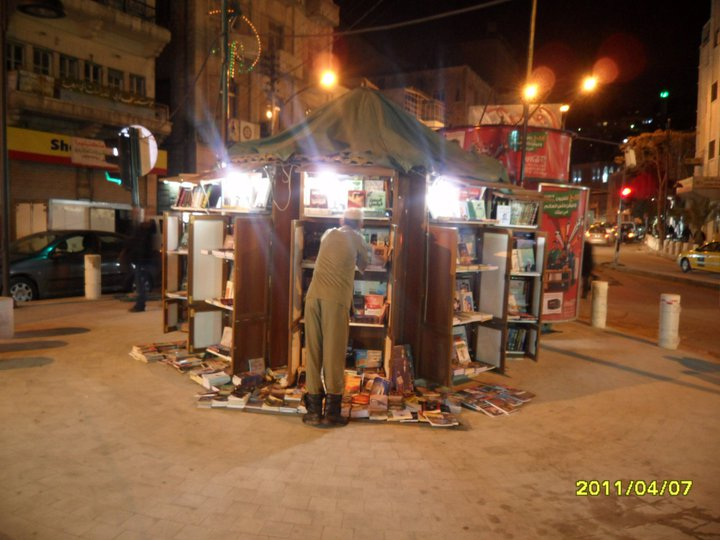
The Central Post Office branch of al-Jahith's Treasury, owned and operated by Hisham al-Maaytah

As of January 2017, al-Jahith's Treasury consists of three branches in downtown Amman, each branch owned and managed by a different son of Mamduh Al-Maaytah. The most central and best-recognized of the three is Hisham's kiosk across from the Central Post Office (31.95205°N 35.93150°E). Hamzeh's branch is located in the nook behind the Roman Nymphaeum on Quraysh Street (31.95049°N 35.93639°E), and Muhammad's stand is adjacent to the Roman Amphitheater (31.95189°N 35.93790°E). In the summer of 2016, Hamzeh Al-Maaytah renamed his branch al-Maa ("Water") Bookstore.

The current generation has carried on Mamduh's mission to make knowledge accessible to all people, regardless of ability to pay. The stores' central location on the streets of downtown Amman—and the 24/7 opening hours of al-Maa Bookstore—enables people to take advantage of the book-lending and exchanging programs daily. In March 2016, Hamzeh inaugurated a new initiative for al-Maa Bookstore called "Take a book and read / Pay any price you please" (Arabic: خذ كتاب تستفيد / ادفع كما تريد), with a week-long book fair in the city of Madaba., and he has carried out six other book fairs in schools and municipalities in different towns in Jordan.

In March 2017, al-Maa Bookstore (Hamzeh's branch) was at risk of closing, and the Jordanian and international allies of al-Maa Bookstore launched a crowdfunding campaign on Indiegogo to save it.

Hisham Al-Maaytah was killed in a car accident on March 3, 2018. Jordan's King Abdullah II attended the wake in Karak and paid his respects to the Al-Maaytah family.
