= Queen Street =

Queen Street or Queen St may refer to:

== Roads ==
=== Australia ===
- Queen Street, Brisbane
- Queen Street, Fremantle
- Queen Street, Melbourne
- Queen Street, Woollahra, Sydney

=== Canada ===
- Queen Street, Hamilton
- Queen Street, Ottawa
- Queen Street, Toronto
- Queen Street East, Brampton (Peel Regional Road 107), in Brampton, Ontario
- Queen Street West, Brampton (Peel Regional Road 6), in Brampton, Ontario

=== United Kingdom ===
==== England ====
- Queen Street, Burslem, Stoke-on-Trent
- Queen Street, London, in the City of London
- Queen Street, Mayfair, London
- Queen Street, Oxford

==== Scotland ====
- Queen Street, Glasgow
- Queen Street, Edinburgh

==== Wales ====
- Queen Street, Cardiff, Wales

=== Other places ===
- Queen Street (Boston, Massachusetts), a previous name of Court Street
- Queen Street, Auckland, New Zealand
- Queen Street, Dublin, Ireland
- Queen Street, Singapore

== Songs ==
- "Queen St" (song), 2025, from 6ix Pop

== See also ==
- Queen Street station (disambiguation)
- Great Queen Street, London
