= The Second Shelf =

Women's bookshop in London

- Type: Bookshop
- Founded: 20 November 2018
- Founder: A. N. Devers
- Headquarters: 14 Smith's Court, Soho, W1D 7DW, City of Westminster, London, United Kingdom
- Number of locations: 1 (September 2022)
- Owners: A. N. Devers
- Website: www.thesecondshelf.com

The Second Shelf is an independent bookshop in Soho, London with a focus on rare or rediscovered women's literature. It was founded in 2018 as a feminist bookshop. It also operates as an online bookshop. The name "The Second Shelf" comes from the title of Meg Wolitzer's 2012 essay in The New York Times Book Review about sexism towards women's fiction. It is a reference to The Second Sex, a book by Simone de Beauvoir.

== Description ==
The bookshop specialises in rare, rediscovered, and antiquarian books or manuscripts written by women. They also sell objects and ephemera related to women's literature, as well as the contemporary women's literature they view as undervalued. Many books in the shop are first editions, or signed books. Some few books sold are written by men, about women. Examples of authors featured by the shop include Jane Austen, Gwendolyn Brooks, the Bröntes, Elizabeth David, Virginia Woolf, Toni Morrison, and Zadie Smith.

The Second Shelf is aligned with intersectional feminism, "in its stock and perspective". As such, they take efforts to stock works by underrepresented groups: this includes "work by LGBTQ+ women, women from outside Europe and North America, and women of colour." Among their stock, they attempt to provide books that are affordable for people with a low budget. Describing the catalogue in 2019, the shop's founder stated: "The prices on rare books command a certain amount of seriousness, but we have books from £6 [to] £20,000 with everything in between. The £20,000 book is Jane Austen's best friend's copy of Sense and Sensibility. It's got her signature: Martha Lloyd. We also have Sylvia Plath's skirt for sale."

The shop publishes a magazine called The Second Shelf: Rare Books and Words by Women. The magazine was launched in spring 2018. It "showcases photographs of rare books, in addition to essays, poems, interviews, and profiles by women". The shop's owner described it as a "fashion magazine for books to read in your tub." Some contributors to the magazine have included Joanna Walsh, Lucy Scholes, and Lauren Groff.

== History ==
A. N. Devers, the founder and owner of the shop, had previously worked at Ruminator Books. She first conceptualised The Second Shelf in 2014. In particular, she was inspired to create it when she felt there was special emphasis on men's literature among book fairs, sellers, and collectors. Devers commented, "I loved the books and was captivated by the trade, but sometimes I'd read a beautiful auction catalogue and there wouldn't be a single book by or about a woman [...] So I had this whimsical idea that if I were a rare-book dealer, I would sell books by women."

Devers moved to London from New York City in 2016. Prior to opening as a brick-and-mortar location, the shop staff sold books at book fairs — The Second Shelf launched in 2017 as a pop-up shop with an accompanying online storefront. Though the shop was originally conceptualised as merely an online shop, Devers received a discounted leasing offer for physical shop space. The Second Shelf obtained some of its initial funding through a 2018 Kickstarter campaign, which yielded about £32,000. The bookshop opened on November 20, 2018. Shortly after opening, the bookshop went viral online.

The Second Shelf has since sold to museums and libraries seeking women's literature to diversify their collections. The shop was named "Indie Bookstore of the Month" by Damian Barr's Literary Salon for March 2020. Since its founding, the shop has initiated campaigns supportive of the transgender community: In 2020, they donated proceeds from sales of J. K. Rowling's books to Mermaids, a charity for transgender youth. A letter signed by over 1,500 individuals in the literary industry was published by The Second Shelf in September 2020, intended as "a message of love and solidarity for the trans and non-binary community." In 2021, they ran a campaign to promote transgender women writers.

The shop was negatively impacted by the COVID-19 pandemic. They shifted to a more online-focused business model for the time being, with the brick-and-mortar location used as "basically an online shipping and receiving area". As of October 2021, the shop was planning to relocate due in part to the lack of space.

== See also ==
- Persephone Books
- Bluestockings (bookstore)
- Gay's the Word (bookshop)
