= Renaud-Bray =

Canadian bookstore chain

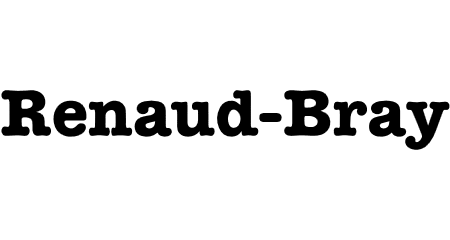
- Industry: Retail
- Founded: 1965
- Founders: Pierre Renaud; Edmond Bray
- Headquarters: Montreal, Quebec, Canada
- Number of locations: 31
- Products: Books, digital books, games, gifts items
- Website: renaud-bray.com

Renaud-Bray (French pronunciation: [ʁəno bʁe]) is the largest chain of French-language bookstores in North America, and the second largest bookstore chain in Canada, after Chapters/Indigo.

== History ==
The chain was founded in 1965 by Pierre Renaud and Edmond Bray, with the opening of its first store on Côte-des-Neiges Road in Montreal, Quebec, Canada. The chain began its expansion in 1978, opening other branches in Montreal (on Laurier Avenue, Saint Denis Street, Park Avenue, and Peel Street). At the same time, it began computerizing its inventory, becoming one of the first bookstores to do so.

In 1995, Renaud-Bray opened a large store on Yonge Street in Toronto, Ontario. This store was a major failure and, in 1996, Renaud-Bray entered bankruptcy protection. The chain, however, survived.

In the summer of 1999, Renaud-Bray purchased two of its competitors in Quebec: Librairie Garneau and Librairie Champigny, giving it 23 outlets across the province.

As of September 27, 2016, the company's website lists 29 locations including 12 in Montreal, 3 in Quebec City and 2 in Laval.

In May 2015, Quebecor signed an agreement to sell the 14 retail stores of Archambault and the single unit Paragraph Anglophone bookstore to Renaud-Bray. Renaud-Bray indicated they did not have intentions to immediately change the names of the newly acquired stores; they would keep the distinct brands and manage them as separate entities. The sale was completed in September 2015 after receiving regulatory approval from the Competition Bureau.

Renaud-Bray acquired the book distributor Prologue in 2017.
