= Weltbild =

German publisher and media retailer

Weltbild Publishing Group
- Type: GmbH & Co. KG
- Founded: 2001
- Founder: Josef Hall
- Defunct: 31 August 2024
- Headquarters: Augsburg, Germany
- Key people: Christian Sailer, Angela Schünemann
- Number of employees: 1,300 (December 2015)
- Parent: Droege International Group
- Website: www.weltbild.com

Weltbild Publishing Group (German: Verlagsgruppe Weltbild) was a major German publisher and media retailer based in Augsburg. It was partner of the holding company DBH Deutsche Buch Handels GmbH & Co. KG and itself it is owned by the dioceses of the Roman Catholic Church of Germany. The name Weltbild roughly translates to "worldview".

Since 2001, Weltbild had had a joint venture with OZ-Verlag in the magazine sector (Living & More GmbH, Offenburg). There were also 50/50 joint ventures with the Belgian media company Belgomedia (Bayard Presse, France, and Roularta Media, Belgium). Weltbild published magazines in the Parenting and Family, 40-plus/50-plus, and Home and Garden segments. In fiscal 2007/2008, Weltbild sold its entire magazine division to the French Bayard Group.

As of 2006, Weltbild claims to be Germany's largest media and mail-order company, with a market share of ten percent. It also says it is No. 2 among online book retailers (presumably after Amazon.de). Weltbild employs some 6,400 employees and has a revenue of 1.7 billion EUR. According to the enterprise, some 5.5 million customers in the German-speaking countries buy Weltbild books by mail order, in one of the 300 Weltbild shops or over the Internet. Its mail-order catalogue has a print run of four million.

== Bankruptcies ==
Weltbild filed for bankruptcy on 10 January 2014. On 2 August 2014 the financial investor Droege International Group bought 60% of the company's shares and started a recapitalisation.

In June 2024, Weltbild filed for insolvency. Their remaining 14 stores were closed by the end of August and their website was taken down. Rival bookstore Thalia acquired Weltbild's online assets in September.

== Controversy ==
Erotica books in the assortment of the company caused a controversy in 2011.

In June 2013, Weltbild ran into controversy when they notified Canadian based publishing house Icon Empire Press that they would no longer be carrying their book titles. Weltbild informed the publishing house that they were owned by the Diocese of the Catholic Church of Germany and the book titles carried by Icon Empire Press did not meet the standards of traditional values.
