= Page One (bookstore) =

Singaporean bookstore chain

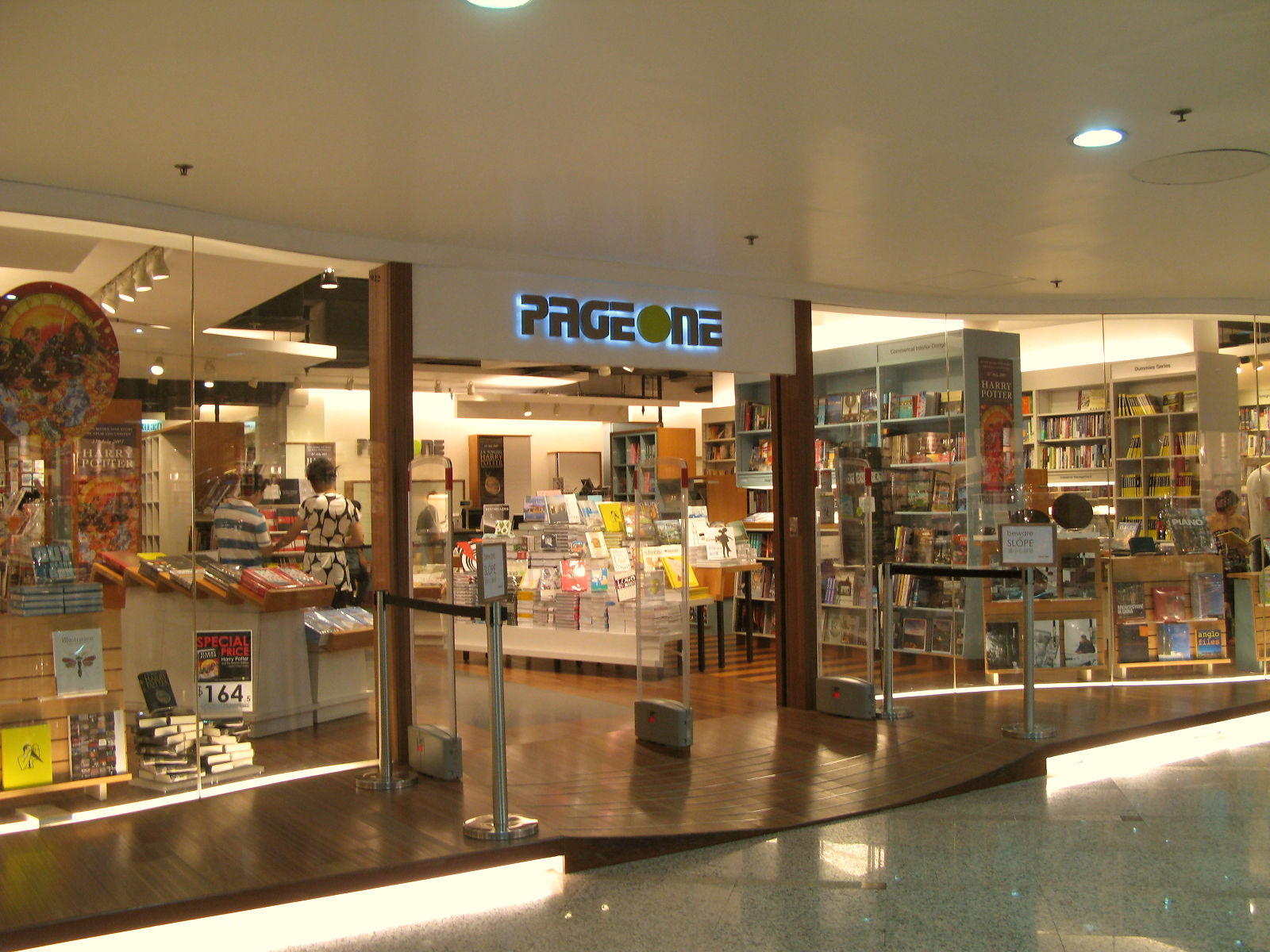
- Industry: Retail
- Genre: Various
- Founded: 1983
- Founder: Mark Tan
- Headquarters: Singapore (formerly); China
- Area served: China
- Products: Books, Gifts, and Stationeries
- Website: pageonegroup.com

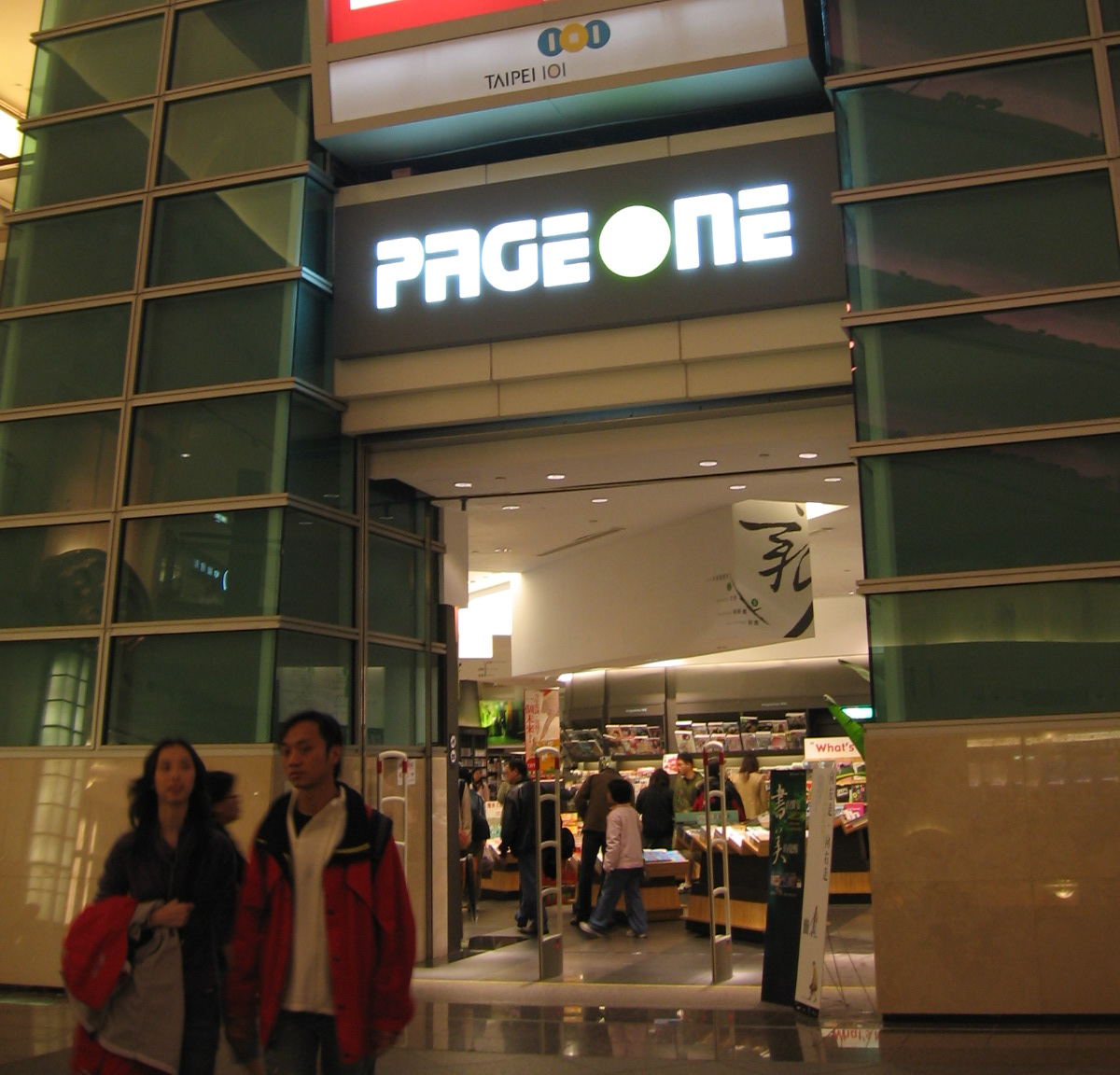
A Page One book retailer outlet at Taipei 101, Taiwan.

Page One (Chinese: 叶壹堂; pinyin: Yèyī Táng) is a bookstore chain and publisher founded in Singapore by Mark Tan (陈家强), with three branches in mainland China. Traditionally focused on English language books, it has recently expanded into the Chinese language market. Some branches closed in Singapore (2011), Taiwan (2015), and Hong Kong (November 2016).

== History ==
Page One began in 1983, when a small shop stocking handpicked art and design books opened in a shopping mall in Singapore. The small shop accumulated a loyal following over the years and evolved into a brand.

Since then, Page One has marked its presence with bookstores in China, Hong Kong, Singapore, Thailand and Taiwan. In Singapore, the Page One bookstore was established at VivoCity, the shopping mall touted to be the largest of its kind on the island.

While it began as a retail outfit, Page One has also expanded in the areas of book publishing and distribution over the years. In publishing, Page One builds its strength from the acquisition of rights and creation of original in-house titles, with a focus on art and design content. Page One Publishing also brought its created titles to the West by selling territorial rights. These titles have been translated into eleven different languages. As a distributor, Page One has established a strong network in Asia and the rest of the world.

The chain managed to obtain approval for opening outlets in mainland China in early 2010s, and started reducing the number of political books stocked. No books deemed to be on sensitive topics are sold inside the country, except Hong Kong.

In 2012, it closed its Singapore store located at VivoCity.

In 2016, shortly after the disappearance of five people linked to an independent Hong Kong book publishing house, the chain removed political books and books on sensitive topics from their store at Hong Kong airport. The company will stop selling these titles in Hong Kong once existing stocks have been exhausted, leading to criticisms from academics that this forced disappearance from bookshop shelves as a result of the case was blatant self-censorship.

In 2017, Page One restarted operations in Singapore with a bargain bookstore at The Cathay.

== Design ==
Mark Tan and his brother, architect Kay Ngee Tan (陈家毅), uniquely incorporated Southeast Asian art into their stores. For instance in Taipei, Vietnamese, Burmese and Thai etc., artworks were specially designed for the store, which customers could also purchase.

Southeast Asian clothworks decorate Page One stores and the decor is changed every season. This design initiative brought about the rise of "giant"-sized bookstores in Asia.

== Store locations ==
- China
  - Beijing Fun
  - Indigo, Beijing
  - The Square, Beijing
- Singapore (closed)
- Hong Kong (closed)
- Taipei (closed)
