= John W. Doull, Bookseller =

Canadian bookstore

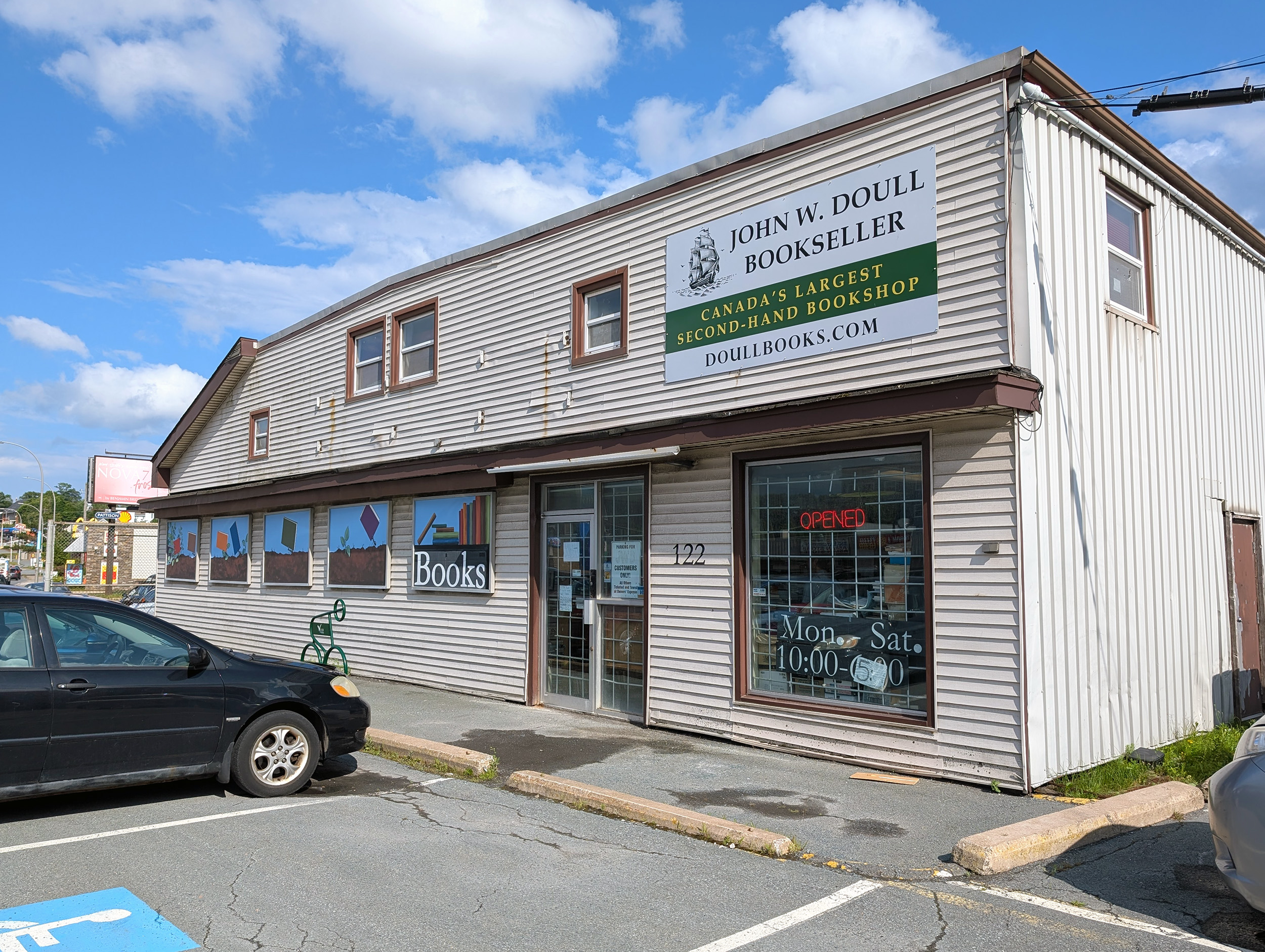
- Company type: Bookstore
- Founded: June 1987; 38 years ago in Halifax, Nova Scotia, Canada
- Founder: John W. Doull
- Headquarters: 122 Main Street, Dartmouth, Nova Scotia, Canada
- Owner: Jacob Smith
- Website: www.doullbooks.com

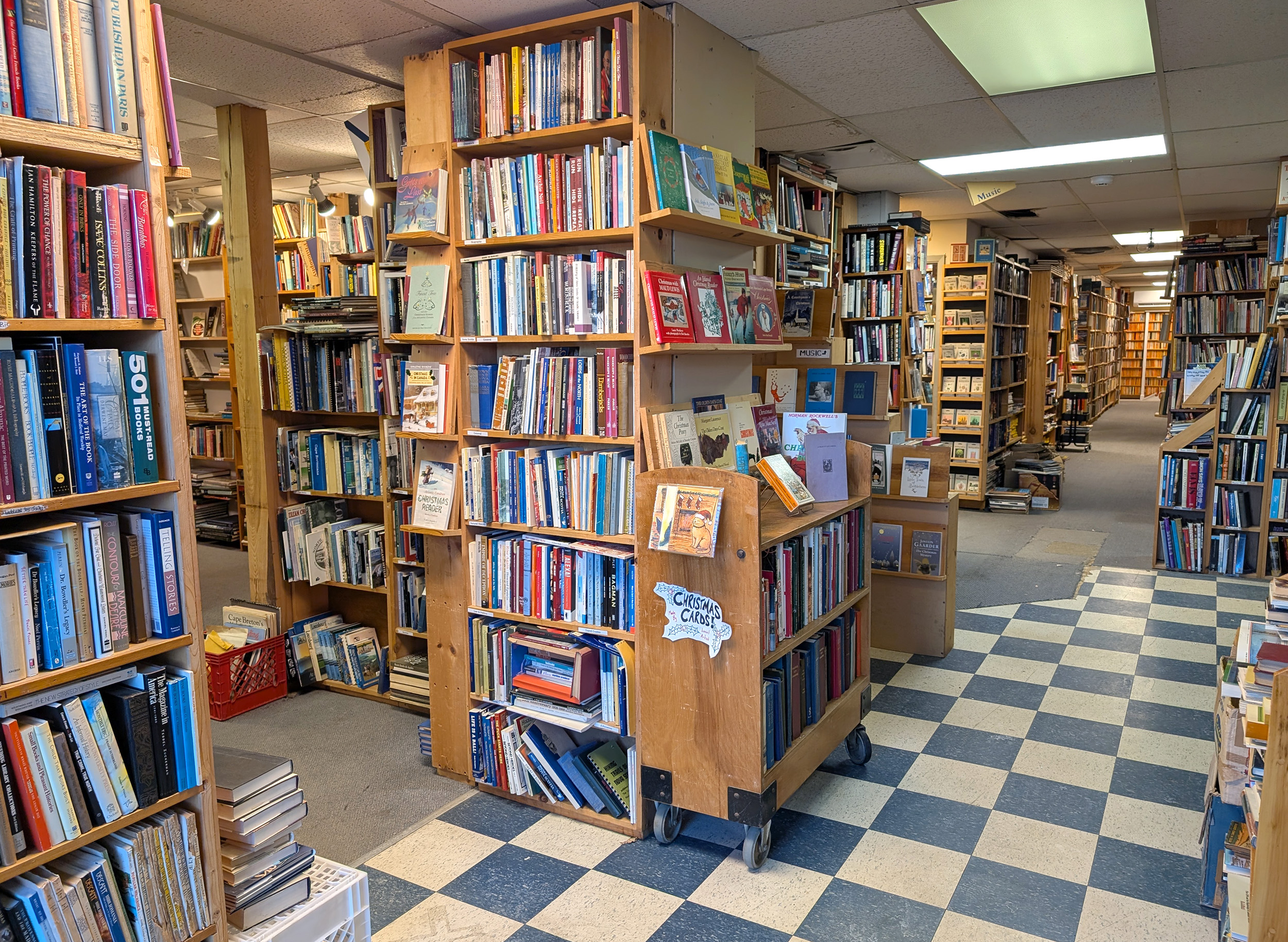
Shop interior

John W. Doull, Bookseller is a Canadian bookstore in Dartmouth, Nova Scotia. Founded in Halifax by John Doull in 1987, the store moved to Dartmouth in 2012. The store faced potential closure in 2025 due to unpaid rent, but was able to remain open following community support. Ownership of the store was subsequently transferred to 24-year-old employee Jacob Smith. The store has an estimated inventory of 2 to 3 million books, potentially making it one of the largest in Canada.

== History ==
John Doull began his career in bookselling at Schooner Books in Halifax, before founding his own business in June 1987. The shop was first located at 1652 Granville Street, in Downtown Halifax, before moving a block away to 1684 Barrington Street. The store was named "Best Second-Hand Bookstore" in 2006 by The Coast. In 2012, the store moved from Downtown Halifax to a new location on Main Street in Dartmouth.

In July 2025, the store faced potential closure due to two months of unpaid rent, requiring $15,000 to $20,000 to continue operating. The store announced a 40% discount to raise funds. Subsequent community support and increased purchases enabled the store to pay the outstanding rent by the deadline of 25 July, avoiding eviction. The store reopened with plans for operational changes and re-cataloguing efforts. John Doull subsequently stepped back from daily operations of the store, with 24-year-old employee Jacob Smith becoming the new owner soon after.

The store has an estimated inventory of 2 to 3 million books, which if accurate would make it among the largest bookstores in Canada.

== See also ==
- The Book Room
