= Hugendubel =

German book retailer

- Company type: limited partnership (GmbH & Co. KG)
- Industry: Retail (Specialty)
- Founded: 1893
- Headquarters: Munich
- Key people: Ekkehard Lux, Thomas Nitz, Torsten Brunn, Nina Hugendubel, Maximilian Hugendubel
- Revenue: ▲$302 million EURO (2011)
- Number of employees: 1700 (2016)
- Website: hugendubel.de

Hugendubel is, along with Thalia, one of two major book retailers in Germany. It was founded in 1893 by Heinrich Karl Gustav Hugendubel in Munich.

== History ==
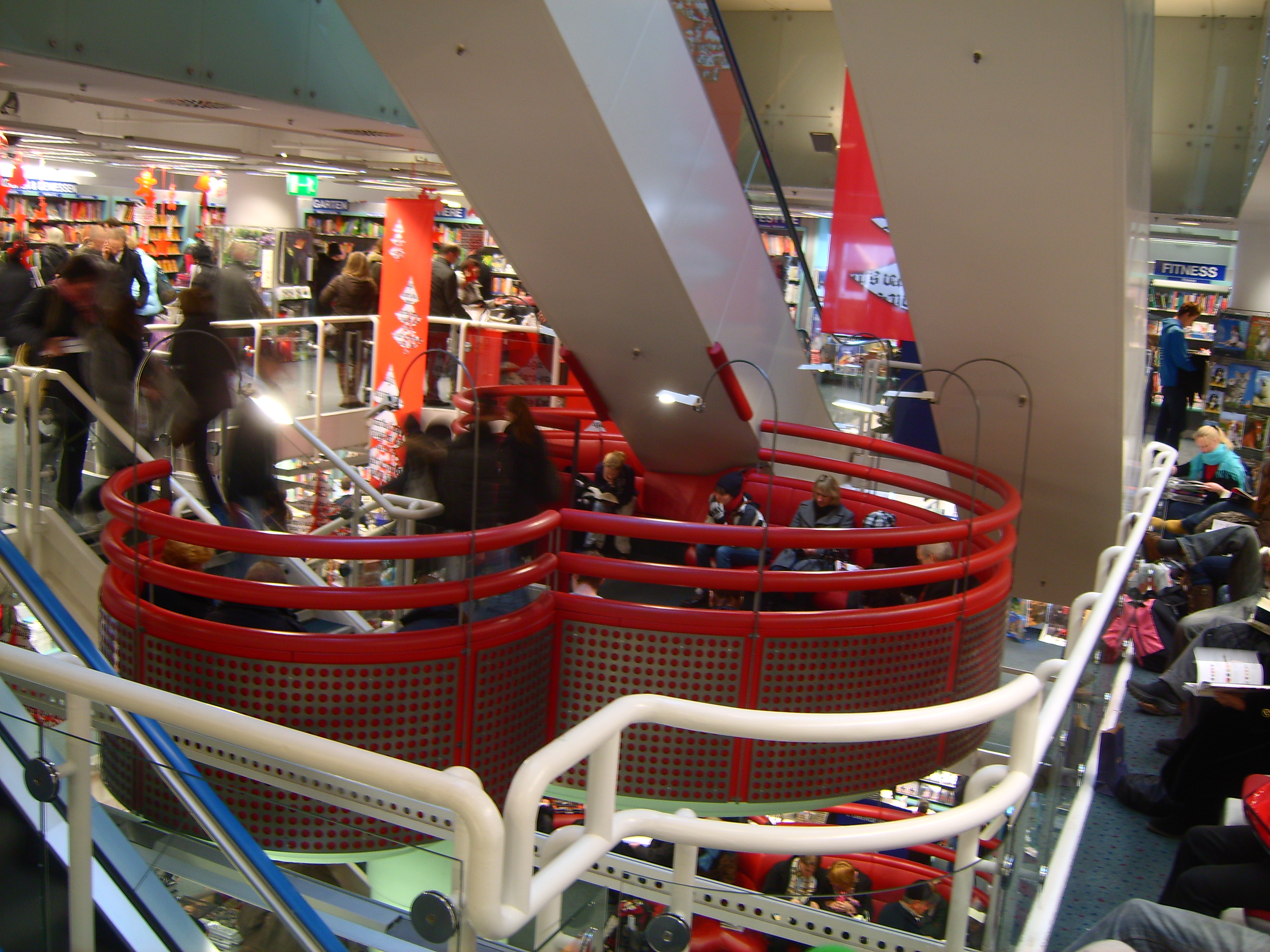
Interior of Munich's main branch at the Marienplatz. The arrangement of reading areas was innovative in the early 1980s, giving the bookshop a design between department store and a public library

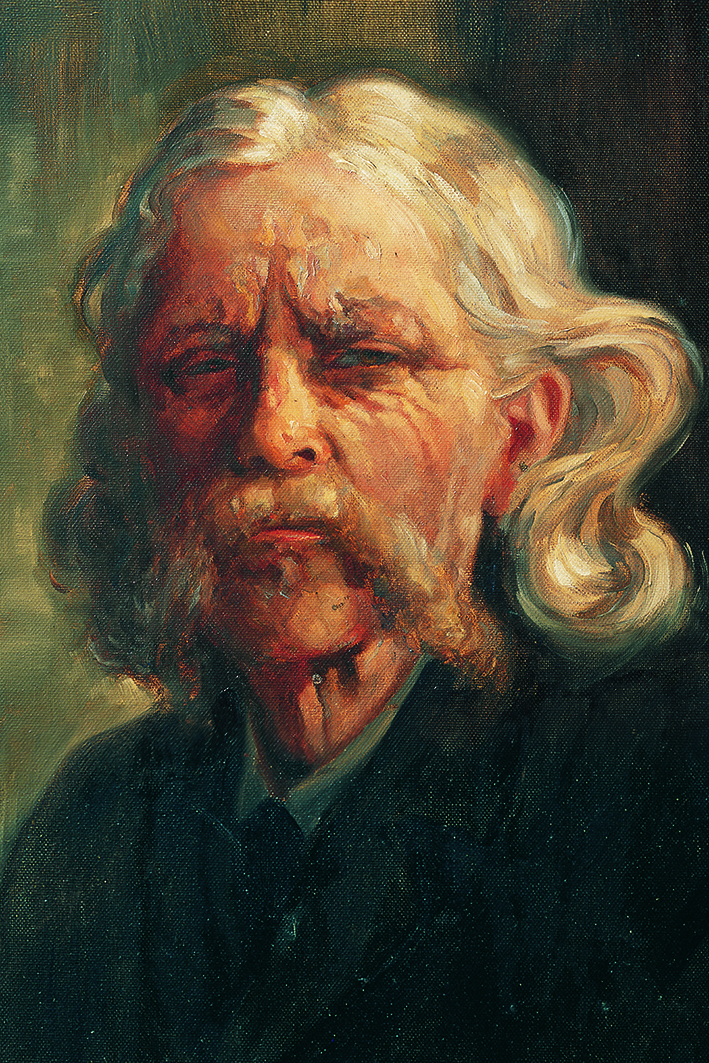
Heinrich Karl Gustav Hugendubel, 1893

Heinrich Karl Gustav Hugendubel bought an existing bookshop at Salvatorplatz in Munich in 1893, laying the foundation for a German limited partnership, GmbH & Co. KG. The firm was left to his son, Heinrich Hugendubel, in 1916 and then his son, Paul Hugendubel, in 1934. After Paul's death in 1943, his wife, Anneliese Hugendubel, assumed control, acting as managing chief until 1964 when their son, Heinrich Hugendubel, opened the first branch in Munich. Heinrich Hugendubel II, led the enterprise till his death in 2005 and incorporated acting partners Ekkehard Lux, Thomas Nitz, Torsten Brunn, Nina Hugendubel and Maximilian Hugendubel.

In January 2011, the company was accused of censoring its own trade union blog. In cooperation with Weltbild publishing house, a "filter" was briefly applied to Hugendubel's online shop, which filtered out numerous gay and lesbian, church-critical, esoteric and communist articles. After a unanimous critical media response, the filter was removed and titles were relisted.
