= Fascination Books =

South African bookstore chain

Fascination Books was one of South Africa's largest book chains with branches throughout South Africa. After 13 years of considerable growth, owner and founder Johan Marais applied for liquidation in October 2008. The company was the largest independent book chain in the South Africa. It stocked a wide range of books, focussing on religious books, while also stocking a great variety of books in Afrikaans.

== Johan Marais ==
Beside Johan Marais being the founder and sole owner of the Fascination Books group, he is also the managing director of the company. He specialises in the field of herpetology and is currently completing a master's degree at the University of Witwatersrand under professor Graham Alexander, with whom he collaborated on the book Guide to Reptiles of Southern Africa. Prior to this he published Snake versus Man (1994), Conservation and Utilization of the Nile Crocodile (1991; with professor Gerrie Smith), Snakes of the World (1984), Snakes and Snakebites (2001) What's that Snake?, a short identification guide on Southern African snakes, as well as Snakes of Southern Africa (2004; originally published in 1992, then totally rewritten), a complete guide, which was followed by the aforementioned reptile guide. All these books are published by Struik Books South Africa.

== Online Store ==
In April 2008, the company also introduced an online store on its website, with a range of up to 3 million books. According to Marais, the online store was formed as a separate company and will not be part of the liquidation.

== Liquidation ==
On Wednesday 22 October 2008 Fascination Books applied for liquidation. The liquidation came as a surprise to the more than 300 people employed by the company. "We knew nothing about this beforehand. On Wednesday afternoon [22 October 2008] the liquidators walked in and we had to hand over the keys and leave the shop immediately," said a shocked employee to the press.
