= Book City (Canada) =

Independent bookstore in Ontario, Canada

Book City is a Canadian independent book store chain based out of Toronto.

== History ==
Book City opened its first store in the Annex neighborhood of Toronto in 1976.

== Locations ==
At its peak, the chain had six locations in Toronto.

Their flagship location at 501 Bloor Street West in The Annex neighbourhood closed in 2014. Their location in the High Park neighbourhood closed in 2012, but a new location was opened nearby 2 years later. As of 2026 four locations remain:

- Book City Bloor West Village — 2354 Bloor St. West
- Book City on Danforth — 348 Danforth Ave.
- Book City in the Beach — 1950 Queen St. East
- Book City St. Clair — 1430 Yonge Street
