= JWD InfoLogistics =

Thai logistics company

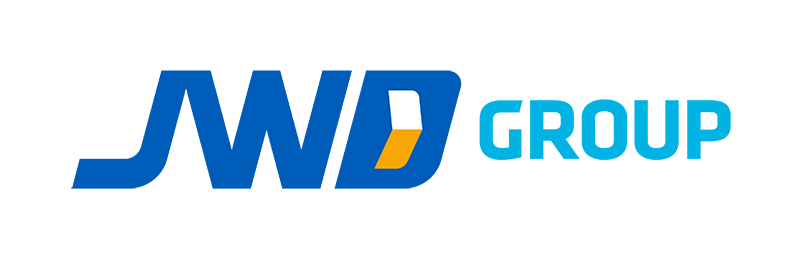
- Native name: เจดับเบิ้ลยูดี อินโฟโลจิสติกส์
- Type: Public
- Traded as: SET: SJWD
- Founded: 1979
- Headquarters: Bangkok, Thailand,
- Key people: Mangkon Dhanasarnsilp (Chairman); Charvanin Bunditkitsada (CEO); Jitchai Nimitpanya (Deputy CEO)
- Services: Logistics and supply chain service (Thailand and ASEAN countries)
- Number of employees: 2,000 (2021)
- Website: www.jwd-group.com

JWD InfoLogistics Public Company Limited (JWD; SET: SJWD) is logistics and supply chain service provider in Thailand and ASEAN countries.

== History ==
JWD InfoLogistics started its business with home and office moving services under the name of JVK International Movers Company Limited in 1979. The company later expanded its portfolio of business into the logistics and supply chain industry and converted into a public company and listed in the Stock Exchange of Thailand on September 29, 2015. JWD Group decided to cooperate with Flash Group and Thailand Post to launch the Cold Chain Express named Fuze Post on September 1, 2021.

In 2023, JWD InfoLogistics merged with SCG Logistics Management Co.,Ltd (SCGL) and was renamed SCGJWD Logistics Public Company Limited

SCGJWD operates in 9 ASEAN countries plus China and has over 2,400 corporate customers.

== Service ==
- Domestic Transportation & Distribution
- General and Free Zone Warehouse
- Cold Chain Logistics and Warehouse
- Automotive Logistics Management
- Freight Service, Import, and Export
- Document Storage
- Chemicals and Dangerous Goods Logistics
- Moving Service
- Self Storage Service
- Fine Art Logistics Service
- Fulfillment Service
- Extra Size Fulfillment Service
- Overseas Logistics Service
- Etc

== Organization ==
JWD and its subsidiaries handle logistics operations including land transport, warehouse and supply chain management, IT solutions for logistics and investment. Its main service is warehouse and yard management, which contributes more than 50 percent of revenue. It specializes in three product areas: automotive and parts, cold chain logistics, and dangerous goods & chemicals. It handles approximately 70% of hazardous substances flowing through the ports of the Port Authority of Thailand.

== Awards ==
JWD received the Thailand Sustainability Investment (THSI) award in 2018, 2019, 2020 and 2021 The award is granted to the listed companies with excellent performance in corporate governance and social responsibility.
