= Alex Beckstead =

American film director

- Occupation: Filmmaker

Alex Beckstead is a documentary filmmaker based in San Francisco.

Beckstead graduated from the University of Utah with a B.A. in Film Studies. His first short film, "sXe" screened at the 1999 Sundance Film Festival. He previously directed Trailer Park Blues (2002), a film about his grandfather's struggle with alcoholism while he and Beckstead's grandmother were living in a trailer park.

Beckstead's Paperback Dreams (2008) is about "two landmark independent bookstores and their struggle to survive. The film follows Andy Ross, owner of Cody's Books, and Clark Kepler, owner of Kepler's Books, over the course of two tumultuous years in the book business."
