= The Golden Gate (Seth novel) =

1986 novel by Vikram Seth

- First edition
- Author: Vikram Seth
- Language: English
- Publisher: Random House
- Publication date: March 12, 1986
- Publication place: United States
- Media type: Print (Hardcover)
- Pages: 307 pp
- ISBN: 0-394-54974-0
- OCLC: 12081140
- Dewey Decimal: 813/.54 19
- LC Class: PR9499.3.S38 G65 1986

The Golden Gate (1986) is the first novel by poet and novelist Vikram Seth. The work is a novel in verse composed of 590 fourteen-line Onegin stanzas written in iambic tetrameter, with the rhyme scheme following the aBaBccDDeFFeGG pattern of Eugene Onegin by Alexander Pushkin. It was inspired by Charles Johnston's translation of Eugene Onegin.

== Plot summary ==
Set in the 1980s, The Golden Gate follows a group of yuppies in San Francisco. The inciting action occurs when lonely protagonist John Brown learns with consternation that his friend and former love Janet Hayakawa has mischievously placed an amorous advertisement of Brown in the newspaper in his behalf; the advertisement is answered, at length, by trial-lawyer Elisabeth ('Liz') Dorati. A short heyday follows, in which Seth introduces and develops a variety of characters united in part by their interest in self-actualization (often in the form of agriculture) and in part by closeness to Liz or John. Thereafter is depicted the progress of their marriage de facto until its dissolution, which results in the legal marriage of Liz to John's friend Phillip ('Phil') Weiss, and the birth of their son. Following his rejection of Liz, John finds a second paramour in Janet, until the latter and two other friends die in an automobile collision; and is himself invited to stand godfather to Liz's son.

== Background ==
At the time of the novel's composition, Seth was a graduate student in Economics at Stanford University. Seth described the origins of the novel as a "pure fluke." While conducting tedious research for his dissertation, Seth would divert himself with trips to the Stanford Bookstore:

On one such occasion, I found in the poetry section, two translations of Eugene Onegin, Alexander Pushkin's great novel in verse. Two translations but each of them maintained the same stanzaic form that Pushkin had used. Not because I was interested in Pushkin or Eugene Onegin, but purely because I thought, this is interesting technically that both of them should have been translated so faithfully, at least as far as the form goes. I began to compare the two translations, to get access to the original stanzas behind them, as I don’t know Russian. After a while, that exercise failed, because I found myself reading one of them for pure pleasure. I must have read it five times that month. It was addictive. And suddenly, I realized that this was the form I was looking for to tell my tales of California. The little short stories I had in my mind subsided and this more organically oriented novel came into being. I loved the form, the ability that Pushkin had to run through a wide range of emotions, from absolute flippancy to real sorrow and passages that would make you think, during and after reading it."

In addition, portions of the novel make reference to (the now defunct) Printers Inc. Bookstore and Cafe in neighboring Palo Alto, California (sonnets 8.13 to 8.16).

== Themes ==
At intervals, various characters discuss arguments either against or in favor of homosexuality, Christianity, civil disobedience, feminism, and tolerance; whereas the narrative, by example of danger or anti-intellectualism, implies warning against alcoholism or carelessness, and elsewhere criticizes news-media and art-criticism for unjust treatment of their subjects.

== Reception ==
The novel brought its author the 1988 Sahitya Akademi Award for English, by the Sahitya Akademi, India's National Academy of Letters. Roger Scruton in I Drink Therefore I Am wrote that Seth beautifully evokes Italian immigrants' "life among the vines".

Douglas Hofstadter calls reading The Golden Gate "perhaps the key trigger" for his book on translation Le Ton beau de Marot, and posits that it could be considered a "translation" of Eugene Onegin due to their similarities in form and style, despite their unrelated plots.

== Adaptations ==
The book was adapted into an opera in 2010 by composer Conrad Cummings.
