= Beckstead =

Beckstead is a surname. Notable people with the surname include:

- Alex Beckstead, American film director and producer
- Ian Beckstead (born 1957), Canadian football player
