= Jan Ellison =

American novelist (born 1966)

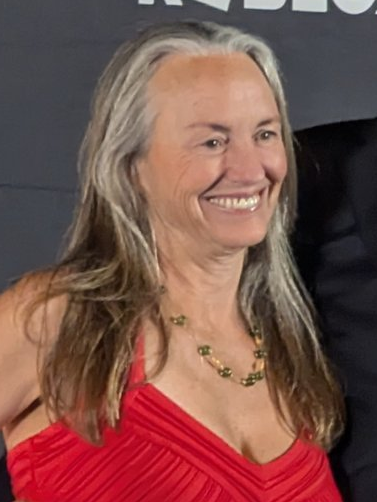
- Ellison in 2025
- Born: January 17, 1966 (age 60); San Jose, California
- Education: Stanford University; San Francisco State University; University of California, Berkeley
- Spouse: David Baszucki (m. 2005)
- Writing career
- Language: English
- Years active: 2007–present
- Genre: Suspense
- Notable works: "The Company of Men"; A Small Indiscretion
- Notable awards: O. Henry Award
- Website: janellison.com

Jan Ellison (born January 17, 1966) is an American novelist, philanthropist and the wife of Roblox CEO David Baszucki. She won an O. Henry Award for "The Company of Men", her first published short story, in 2007. In 2015, she published her first novel A Small Indiscretion, her first novel.

== Early life and education ==
Jan Ellison was born on January 17, 1966, in San Jose, California, and grew up in Los Angeles. Her father, Todd Ellison, known also as E.T. Ellison, was a musician who recorded music and also wrote science fiction novels. Her mother was a teacher at an elementary schooll. Her brother, Steve Ellison, is a brewer and production manager for a company called Boundary Bay Brewery.

Ellison first went to Flintridge Sacred Heart Academy, a private Catholic school. Ellison graduated from Stanford University with a undergraduate degree. She then went to San Francisco State University, where she got a Master of Fine Arts, and finally went to the University of California, Berkeley, where she graduated with a master's degree in journalism.

Ellison worked as a cook making French fries at a fast food restaurant. She later became a cashier.

== Career ==
At 19, Ellison left college for a year and traveled to Europe where she stayed in Paris for one year. Afterwards, she moved to London and began to work in an office. Eventually, Ellison moved to Hawaii, Australia and across Southeast Asia, where she stayed for two years.

Ellison began working as a waitress and a typist, and then as a Silicon Valley marketing executive in the 1990's. During this time, she began to write notes in her journals as she traveled.

Ellison began blogging in 2003 on the blogsite Murderati, where she published blogs and books. Ellison wrote her first short story, The Company of Men, in 2007. She then submitted it to 27 different literary journals before finally getting accepted. Afterwards, she won an O'Henry Prize for the story.

=== A Small Indiscretion ===
Ellison took some of the notes she had written in her journals and began to work on A Small Indiscretion. During production of the book, she took an 18-month break, where she began to write her second novel The Safest City, which was reported to have 600 pages. The novel was set in Silicon Valley in 2011. In January 2015, she published the novel, which follows a 40-year-old woman named Annie Black piecing together her past life after a visit from a photographer which depicted Annie with her old boss at her old job. The book is deemed as a suspense novel.

Her book was featured as a recommended book in the San Francisco Chronicle, was reviewed and featured on USA Today as one of the books of the week, and her books were sold in stores such as Kepler's Books.

== Personal life ==
Ellison lives in Portola Valley, California. In 2005, she married Roblox CEO David Baszucki after meeting at Stanford University, and together they have four children. She co-founded The Baszucki group alongside her husband in 2021; she is president of the group. She currently funds neuropsychiatric research. She founded the organization Metabolic Mind to provide for education after one of her sons was diagnosed with bipolar disorder at age 19.
