= Natasha Bagration =

Princess Natalia of Mukhrani
- Lady Johnston
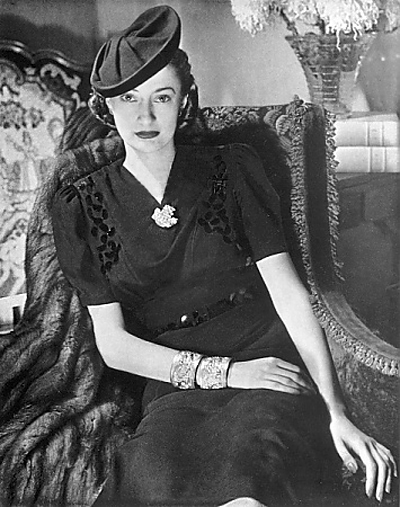
- Born: 19 April 1914; Pavlovsk Palace, Saint Petersburg, Russian Empire
- Died: 26 August 1984 (aged 70); London, England
- Spouse: Sir Charles Johnston (m. 1945)
- House: Bagration-Mukhraneli
- Father: Prince Constantine Bagration of Mukhrani
- Mother: Princess Tatiana Constantinovna of Russia

Princess Natalia Bagration of Mukhrani, Lady Johnston (Georgian: ნატალია "ნატაშა" ბაგრატიონი) (19 April 1914 – 26 August 1984), was a Georgian noblewoman of the House of Mukhrani.

== Early life and ancestry ==
Princess Natasha was born in Pavlovsk Palace on 19 April 1914 and was the daughter of Prince Constantine Bagration of Mukhrani and Princess Tatiana Constantinovna of Russia. She was born into two prominent royal dynasties, the Georgian Bagrationi dynasty and the Russian House of Romanov. At her christening, her godfather was Emperor Nicholas II and his daughter Grand Duchess Olga. Due to her ancestry, she was related to British royal family, being second cousin of Prince Philip, Duke of Edinburgh, second cousin of Princess Marina, Duchess of Kent, and fourth cousin of Queen Elizabeth II.

== Later life ==
After the Russian Revolution, she and her family went to live in Yugoslavia. According to memoirs of Prince Tomislav of Yugoslavia, she was his first childhood crush.

== Marriage ==
While working in London for the Yugoslav government-in-exile, she met and later married British diplomat Sir Charles Johnston on 24 April 1945. Upon his being knighted in 1959, she became formally styled Lady Johnston.

The couple had no children.

== Death ==
She died on 26 August 1984 in London. She had one brother, Prince Teymuraz Bagration-Mukhransky, who, at the time of Natasha'a death, lived in the United States.

== Ancestry ==
Ancestors of Natasha Bagration

8. Prince Michael Bagration of Mukhrani
4. Prince Alexander Bagration of Mukhrani
9. Elizabeth Dimitrievna Ivinskaya
2. Prince Constantine Bagration of Mukhrani
10. Prince Joseph Tarkhan-Mouravi
5. Princess Nino Tarkhan-Mouravi
11. Princess Barbara Jambakur-Orbeliani
1. Princess Natalia Bagration of Mukhrani
12. Grand Duke Constantine Nikolaevich of Russia
6. Grand Duke Constantine Constantinovich of Russia
13. Princess Alexandra of Saxe-Altenburg
3. Princess Tatiana Constantinovna of Russia
14. Prince Moritz of Saxe-Altenburg
7. Princess Elisabeth of Saxe-Altenburg
15. Princess Augusta of Saxe-Meiningen
