= Les Mots à la Bouche =

Book shop in Paris

- The bookshop's exterior in October 2026
- Founded: 1980
- Founder: Jean-Pierre Meyer-Genton, Yves Clerget
- Type: Independent bookshop
- Location: 37 rue Saint-Ambroise, Paris, France
- Coordinates: 48°51′47″N 2°22′44″E
- Website: https://motsbouche.com

Les Mots à la Bouche is an independent bookshop in Paris, specialising in LGBTQ literature. It is the oldest LGBTQ bookshop in France.

== History ==
The bookshop was first opened in 1980 on rue Simart in the 18th Arrondissement of Paris by gay activist Jean-Pierre Meyer-Genton and his associate Yves Clerget. It was the first LGBTQ bookshop to open in France.

In 1983, the shop relocated to 6 rue Sainte-Croix-de-la-Bretonnerie in the Marais. Following Meyer-Genton's death in July 1996, Les Mots à la Bouche was taken over by his partner Walter Paluch.

In 2020, the bookshop was forced to relocate from its premises in the Marais, where it had spent 37 years, as a result of the increasing rents caused by the ongoing gentrification of the area. The shop was relocated to its current address at 37 rue Saint-Ambroise in the 11th Arrondissement, where it reopened in June 2020.

In 2021, the shop's booksellers launched a crowdfunding campaign in order to purchase the shop's assets and become a worker cooperative, which surpassed its goal of €40,000 in three days.

Les Mots à la Bouche has a catalogue of over 15,000 items, offering a wide selection of books, graphic novels, magazines, art books, zines, and DVDs.

In 2026, the bookshop announced via Instagram that it was struggling financially due to increasing rent and monthly charges, calling for both support from customers and a concrete solution from elected officials.
