= A Small Indiscretion =

2015 Suspense novel

- Cover for the working title
- Author: Jan Ellison
- Audio read by: Kathe Mazur
- Working title: A Small Indiscretion: A Novel
- Language: English
- Genre: Suspense
- Publisher: Random House
- Publication date: January 27, 2015
- Publication place: United States
- Pages: 336
- ISBN: 978-0-8129-9544-2
- Website: janellison.com

A Small Indiscretion is a 2015 suspense novel by Jan Ellison. The book was released in January of that year, and was featured on many outlets such as USA Today.

== Premise ==
A woman tries to solve a picture from her past that mysteriously shows up.

== Plot ==
Annie Black is 40 years old, a lighting designer and a young mother of three children living in San Francisco. She is married to a doctor. Annie receives a call from her 21-year-old son Robbie who suffered a car crash and falls into a coma. The book is then narrated by Annie.

A photographer named Patrick visits her and hands her a picture of her working as an office manager for a man named Malcolm who was a wealthy builder 20 years prior in return for an affair. As her son recovers from the car crash, she needs to solve on how the picture showed up and keep her marriage stable.

== History ==
Ellison took some of the notes she journaled in her journals and began to work on A Small Indiscretion. During production of the book, she took an 18-month break, where she began to write her second novel The Safest City, which was reported to have 600 pages. The novel was set in Silicon Valley in 2011.

In January 2015 the novel was published by Random House. An audiobook was later released and is read by Kathe Mazur.

== Reception ==
The novel received positive reviews from various news outlets. The book was featured on San Francisco Chronicle's Book Club. It was reviewed and featured on the recommended books of the week by USA Today. The book was also sold in stores such as Kepler's Books.
