= Vaughn's Book Store =

- U.S. National Register of Historic Places
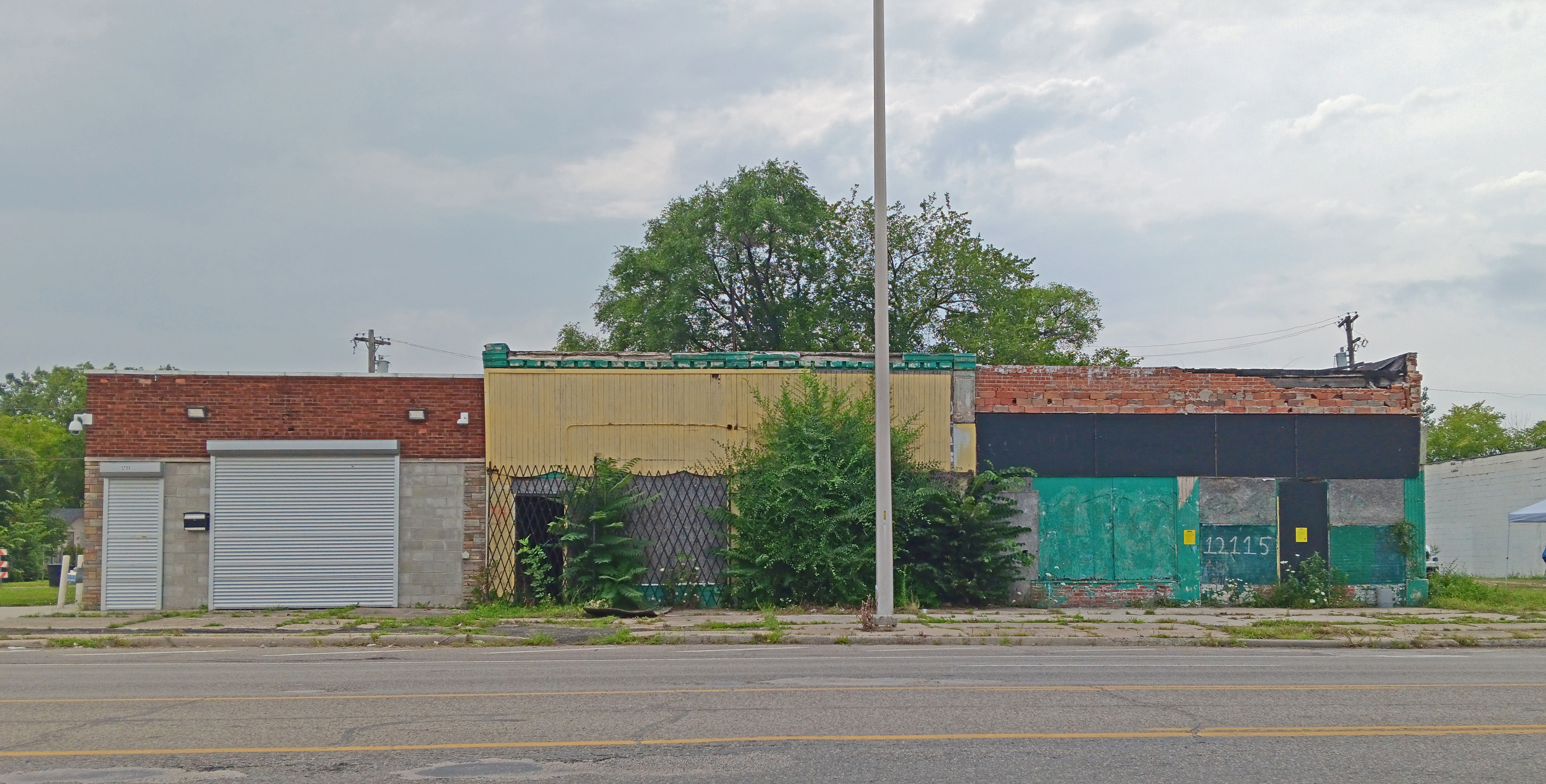
- Vaughn's Book Store in 2023
- Interactive map
- Location: 12115–12123 Dexter Ave. Detroit, Michigan
- Coordinates: 42°22′55″N 83°7′33″W
- Built: c. 1924
- Architectural style: Colonial Revival, Modern Movement
- MPS: The Civil Rights Movement and the African American Experience in 20th Century Detroit MPS
- NRHP reference No.: 100009177
- Added to NRHP: August 4, 2023

Vaughn's Book Store is a commercial building and former bookstore located at 12115–12123 Dexter Avenue in Detroit. It was the first Black-owned bookstore in Detroit. It was listed on the National Register of Historic Places in 2023.

== History ==
Edward Vaughn was born in Abbeville, Alabama, and attended Fisk University, graduating in 1955. He moved to Detroit, was drafted into the Army, and in 1959 began working for the United States Postal Service. Inspired by a visit to Lewis H. Michaux's National Memorial African Bookstore, in the early 1960s Vaughn began selling books out of the trunk of his car. He soon started looking for a permanent store location, and partnered with his aunt Polly Rawls to purchase this building from Saul Lumberg in 1964. The building contained four units, and was built in approximately 1924. The unit at 12117 Dexter Avenue housed a laundry from about 1926 until Vaughn's purchase; the other three units held, at various times, a grocer, fish market, shoe repair shop, a beauty salon, a fruit market, and a roofer. Vaughn's Book Store opened in the building in about January 1965 in the unit at 12123 Dexter Avenue. It was Detroit's first Black-owned bookstore.

Vaughn's Book Store was one of the first bookstores in the nation that focused on themes of Black nationalism, Pan-Africanism, and other Black-oriented themes. After opening, Vaughn's Book Store became a valuable resource for hard-to-find books as well as a cultural meeting place for the Black Detroit community. The store initially survived the start of the 1967 Detroit riot, but was later ransacked, reportedly by officers of the Detroit Police Department. However, the store restocked and prospered, opening in a second location in 1969. By 1972, the bookstore outgrew the building and moved to a nearby structure at 12135 Dexter Avenue. However, soon after the popularity of militant Black nationalist literature declined, and Vaughn closed the Dexter Avenue location in 1979. Vaughn was a member of the Michigan House of Representatives at various points in the late 1970s and 1990s.

Even after closing the bookstore, Vaughn continued to own the building; he leased units to a series of businesses, including Yopps Record Man, the Uhuru Sasa Institute, a gift shop, and Rev. Albert Cleage Jr. as a campaign office. Vaughn sold the building in the early 1980s to the Instant Impressions print shop. However, by the early 2010s the last business had left the building, and it came under City of Detroit ownership.

The bookstore received a $15,000 historic preservation grant from the National Park Service in 2021. It was listed on the National Register of Historic Places in 2023.

== Description ==
The Vaughn's Book Store building is a single-story rectangular commercial building constructed of structural clay tile with orange-brown face brick. The front facade is divided into four equal storefronts of equal area, each of which contains a single door and a large storefront window or a pair of windows. The building has a flat asphalt roof with a parapet front. The former bookstore was located in the northernmost unit.
