= Pauline Laws =

House laws of the House of Romanov of the Russian Empire

The Pauline Laws are the house laws of the Romanov rulers of the Russian Empire. The name comes from the fact that they were initially established by Emperor Paul in 1797. Previously drafted privately as a contract between Paul Petrovich, while the heir apparent, and his wife Maria Feodorovna (Sophie Dorothea of Württemberg), it was made public and signed into law after Paul succeeded his mother, Catherine the Great, in November 1796 and was crowned emperor.

== Order of succession ==
Grand Duke Paul, although proclaimed heir of the throne under his father Peter III in 1762, had been long denied succession by his mother Catherine II, who deposed (and possibly assassinated) his father later that year. Her long reign (1762–1796) was deemed by many of her contemporaries, and by Paul himself, as an usurpation. While still the heir, Paul designed a future legal instrument to preclude such coups and arbitrary successions. The text of the Pauline Laws stipulated that "the heir should be named by the Law itself so that there should be no doubt as to who should succeed".

Paul I abolished Peter the Great's law that allowed each reigning emperor or empress to designate his or her successor and substituted a strict order of succession by proclaiming that the eldest son of the monarch would inherit the throne, followed by other dynasts according to primogeniture in the male line. Paul thus implemented a semi-Salic line of succession to the Russian throne, which would pass to a female and through the female (cognatic) line of the dynasty only upon the extinction of all legitimately-born male dynasts (in this case, only the descendants of Paul I himself). Should the male line become extinct, the female issue of the last reigning monarch would have the priority rights to the throne. This system closely followed the Pragmatic Sanction of 1713 that governed the succession of the Habsburg monarchy.

A female eventually succeeding to the throne would have the style of empress in her own right, but the laws stipulated that her husband would not become emperor. A person in line of succession belonging to a religion other than Eastern Orthodoxy was presumed to either convert to this religion or renounce their succession rights. The law established Russian emperors as "Heads of the Church".

A marriage of a member of the imperial family should not be considered valid until authorized by the emperor (not unlike the British Royal Marriages Act 1772). The legal majority age for an emperor was established as 16 years; until that age, a regency was provided.

== Application ==
Immediately after Paul's assassination in 1801, his family did not appear to follow these laws strictly, as the oath of allegiance to Alexander I contained the words "and to His Imperial Majesty's Successor, who is to be designated", following the custom of Peter the Great. Later, Alexander I authorized the renunciation of succession rights of his brother and legal heir presumptive Constantine Pavlovich via a secret manifesto withheld until the emperor's death. This legally controversial decision contravened the Pauline laws and triggered the succession crisis of 1825.

Over time, the house laws were amended, and in the late Russian Empire, the laws governing membership in the imperial house, succession to the throne, and other dynastic subjects were divided, with some being included in the Fundamental Laws of the Russian Empire and others in the Statute of the Imperial Family (codification of 1906, as amended to 1911).

The next monarch, Nicholas I, and his successors adhered to the Pauline rules in practice. In 1825, 1855, and 1881, following the accession of a new Emperor, his eldest son was recognized as heir apparent and bestowed the title of tsesarevich. In 1865, the future Alexander III became heir apparent and tsesarevich following the death of his elder brother, Nicholas. In 1894 Nicholas II succeeded while still childless and his first four children were daughters. So his younger brothers, first George, who died in 1899, and then Michael, were heirs presumptive until the birth of the emperor's fifth child and only son, Alexei, who became the last Russian heir apparent in 1904.

The latter, still minor, was however denied his succession rights in 1917, when during the Russian Revolution his father abdicated in favour of the Grand Duke Michael, then second in the line of succession, "as We do not wish to part from Our beloved son". This decision was partly triggered by the fact the teenage heir had hemophilia, a condition that was not made public. Technically Nicholas II, albeit still an absolute monarch even under the Fundamental laws of 1906, had no right to remove his son from the order of succession under the Pauline laws, and the abdication of a reigning emperor was not provided for there either.

Grand Duke Michael did not accept the crown in 1917 and the Russian monarchy was abolished. In 1918–1919 the former emperor Nicholas with his family, Grand Duke Michael, and many other Romanovs were killed by the Bolsheviks, and the succession of the defunct Russian throne became disputed between different surviving descendants of the Romanovs in emigration.

== Regency ==
There was no precedent of regency under the Pauline law, the last legal regent being Anna Leopoldovna in 1740–1741. The laws did not provide for automatic identification of who should assume regency over a minor monarch. In 1825, 1855, and 1881, concurrently with the accession manifests of the emperors, their next living brothers were appointed regents in the eventual situation of their respective nephews (who were all then minors) succeeding to the throne before the legal majority. However, these provisions were never put into effect as such a situation never occurred. In 1904, after the birth of Alexei, his uncle Michael was appointed the eventual regent in case Nicholas II died before his majority. Still, Nicholas rescinded this decision in early 1913 as Michael had contracted a marriage against his will. In all four cases, the eventual regent would be the next adult person in the line of succession.

== Religion ==
The Pauline Laws stipulated only the monarchs themselves were of the Eastern Orthodox faith. They held no provisions of the religion embraced by the monarch's consort or the spouses of those in the line of succession, unlike the Act of Settlement of England. However, in practice, since 1740s, the brides of Romanov agnates, who were predominantly Protestant princesses of German states, typically did convert to Eastern Orthodoxy before the marriage and took a Russian name and patronymic that were later a part of their style as grand duchesses, such as Elizaveta Alekseevna, Anna Fedorovna, etc. Exceptions were tolerated since 1870s for spouses of cadet grand dukes, not immediately in the line of succession, who might since then retain Protestantism but accepted a Russian style nevertheless. There existed an idea, never enshrined formally in law, that a descendant of a mother who was not Orthodox had a dubious status as a successor. Duchess Marie of Mecklenburg-Schwerin, known as Grand Duchess Maria Pavlovna, who had kept her Lutheran faith upon her marriage to Grand Duke Vladimir Alexandrovich of Russia in 1874, converted to Orthodoxy 34 years later, shortly before her husband's death. According to some contemporary accounts she did so to strengthen the eventual claim of her sons to the Russian throne.

== Dynastic marriage ==
The original Pauline Laws did not contain legal provisions according to which the descendants of the Romanovs born out of an equal marriage (that is, from a legal marriage permitted by the reigning monarch, but other than with a member of another "reigning or possessing family") should be excluded from the succession. Such norms were first enacted as an additional norm by Alexander I on April 1 (O. S. March 20), 1820, upon the divorce of Constantine Pavlovich from Princess Juliane of Saxe-Coburg-Saalfeld and prior to his subsequent marriage to Joanna Grudzińska. Furthermore, legal spouses of a member of the Imperial family having no "corresponding status" by birth were not accorded a status that the spouses of grand dukes would normally enjoy; typically these marriages, following the German tradition, are called "morganatic marriages" by historians. Neither a morganatic wife of a reigning emperor, in a precedent settled by Catherine Dolgorukova in 1880, had the style of an empress (although Alexander II, which is far from certain, might have considered crowning her later but failed to do so as he was assassinated soon thereafter). Morganatic marriages of the Romanovs were not typically made public nor announced via manifestos, and if such spouses were created count(esse)s or prince(sse)s, their letters patent did not cite their marital status concerning the dynasty.

In the spring of 1911, Princess Tatiana Konstantinovna of Russia became engaged to Prince Konstantin Alexandrovich Bagration (1889–1915), a Georgian by birth who served in the Russian Imperial Guard regiment and would die in World War I. She was to be the first daughter of the Romanovs who openly married a Russian subject or non-dynastic prince since the dynasty had ascended the throne in 1613. Her anxious father approached the Emperor Nicholas II and his empress, Alexandra Fyodorovna of Hesse, for approval.

On 30 November 1910, Grand Duke Constantine Konstantinovich noted in one of his posthumously-published journals (From the Diaries of Grand Duke Konstantin Konstantinovich, Moscow, February 1994) that he had received assurances that "they would never look upon her marriage to a Bagration as morganatic, because this house, like the House of Orléans, is descended from a once ruling dynasty."

Previously, the morganatic wives of Romanov grand dukes had been banished from Russia, along with their disgraced husbands such as Sophia von Merenberg, Countess de Torby and Grand Duke Michael Mikhailovich, as well as Princess Olga Paley and Grand Duke Paul Aleksandrovich). Female Romanovs had dared to marry morganatically only in secret, and the couples' relationships remained open secrets, such as Empress Elizabeth of Russia and Alexey Razumovsky, as well as the second marriage of Grand Duchess Maria Nikolayevna and Count Grigory Stroganov).

Nonetheless, Tatiana Konstantinovna's marriage was legally morganatic. It was in fact the first marriage in the dynasty conducted in compliance with the emperor's formal decision not to accept as dynastic the marriages of even the most junior Romanovs, those who bore only the title of prince or princess, with non-royal partners. According to Always a Grand Duke, the 1933 memoir of Nicholas II's brother-in-law, Grand Duke Alexander Mikhailovich (published in New York, by Farrar and Rinehart, Inc.), concern about the eventual marriages of cadet Romanovs so troubled the senior grand dukes that Alexander approached the emperor about relaxing the requirement that all dynasts marry partners "possessing corresponding rank" enshrined in Article 188 of the Pauline Laws, but he was rebuffed. The grand dukes then officially petitioned the emperor by a commission chaired by Grand Duke Nicholas Nikolayevich of Russia, requesting that a new category of dynastic marriages be recognised, to consist of Imperial princes and princesses entitled, with specific Imperial consent, to marry persons of non-royal blood but retaining the right to transmit to the issue of eligibility to inherit the throne. The emperor's response was issued formally on 14 June 1911 in the form of a memorandum from the Minister of the Imperial Court, Baron Vladimir Frederiks:

The Lord Emperor has seen fit to permit marriages to persons not possessing corresponding rank of not all Members of the Imperial Family, but only of Princes and Princesses of the Blood Imperial ... Princes as well as Princesses of the Blood Imperial, upon contracting a marriage with a person not possessing corresponding rank, shall personally retain the title and privileges which are theirs by birth, with the exception of their right to succession from which they shall have abdicated before entering the marriage. In relation to the categorization of the marriages of Princes and Princesses of the Blood Imperial, the Lord Emperor has seen fit to recognize only two categories in these marriages: (a) equal marriages, i.e. those contracted with persons belonging to a Royal or Ruling House, and (b) unequal marriages, i.e. those contracted with persons not belonging to a Royal or Ruling House, and will not recognize any other categories.

As promised in that communiqué (the so-called "Frederiks Memorandum"), the emperor proceeded to legalise authorised marriages of imperial Romanovs below grand ducal rank to those who lacked "corresponding rank". Such marriages had been altogether banned, rather than deemed morganatic, by Alexander III's ukase #5868 on 23 March 1889. However, ukase #35731/1489, issued on 11 August 1911, amended the 1889 ban with these words: "Henceforth no grand duke or grand duchess may contract a marriage with a person not possessing corresponding rank, that is, not belonging to a Royal or Ruling house".

Both the 1889 and 1911 decrees were addenda to Article 188 of the Pauline laws (recodified as article 63 of the Imperial Family Statute). Left intact, however, was that original statute: "A person of the Imperial family who has entered into a marriage alliance with a person not possessing corresponding rank, that is, not belonging to a Royal or Ruling House, cannot pass on to that person, or to any posterity that may issue from such a marriage, the rights which belong to the Members of the Imperial family".

Also remaining unrepealed was Article 36 ("Children born of a marriage between a member of the Imperial Family and a person not of corresponding rank, that is, not belonging to a Royal or Ruling House, shall have no right of succession to the Throne"). Aside from Article 188, Article 36 applied to prevent Tatiana Konstantinovna's issue from claiming succession rights.

Her contemplated marriage having been rendered legal, Tatiana Konstantinovna renounced her dynastic rights, as was required. Nicholas II acknowledged that in a ukase addressed to the Imperial Senate on 9 February 1914: "Her Highness the Princess Tatiana Konstantinovna has presented to Us over Her own sign manual, a renunciation of the right to succession to the Imperial Throne of All the Russias belonging to Her as a member of the Imperial House". She received in return Nicholas II’s authorisation to marry Bagration-Mukhransky. That was the same family into which Princess Leonida Bagration of Mukhrani, the wife of Vladimir Cyrillovich, was born.

Tatiana Konstantinovna and her Georgian prince were married at her father's estate at Pavlovsk, on 3 September 1911. The emperor was present at the wedding and on the same day issued yet another ukase (#35766): "By Our and Grand Duke Konstantin Konstantinovich's and Grand Duchess Elizaveta Mavrikievna’s consent, the wedding took place on 24th day of this August [old style] of the Daughter of Their Imperial Highnesses, Her Highness the Princess Tatiana Konstantinovna, with Prince Konstantin Bagration-Mukhransky. In consequence of this order: The Princess Tatiana Konstantiovna to retain the title of Highness and henceforth to bear the name of Her Highness the Princess Tatiana Konstantinovna Princess Bagration-Mukhransky...".
