= Charles Johnston (diplomat) =

British diplomat (1912–1986)

Sir Charles Hepburn Johnston GCMG, KStJ (11 March 1912 – 23 April 1986), was a senior British diplomat and translator of Russian poetry.

== Biography ==
He was born in London, the son of Ernest Johnston and Emma Hepburn, on 11 March 1912. He was educated at Winchester College, and Balliol College, Oxford, joining the Diplomatic Service in 1936. He was appointed Third Secretary in Tokyo 1939–1941; First Secretary in Cairo 1945–1948; and Madrid 1948–1955; Head of the China and Korea Department 1952–1954; and Counsellor in Bonn 1954–1955.

His first senior appointment was as Ambassador to Jordan 1956–1959. He then became Governor and Commander-in-Chief of Aden and High Commissioner for the Protectorate of South Arabia 1959–1963.

His final posting was as High Commissioner to Australia 1965–1971. On retirement, he became a company director and published several volumes of prose and poetry. He also translated Alexander Pushkin's novel in verse Eugene Onegin from the Russian, preserving its unusual Onegin stanza form. The translation was published in 1977.

== Honours ==
Within the Order of St Michael and St George he was successively appointed Commander (CMG; 1 June 1953), Knight Commander (KCMG; 1 January 1959) and Knight Grand Cross (GCMG; 1 January 1971). He was named a Knight of the Venerable Order of St John (KStJ) on 16 November 1960.

== Family ==
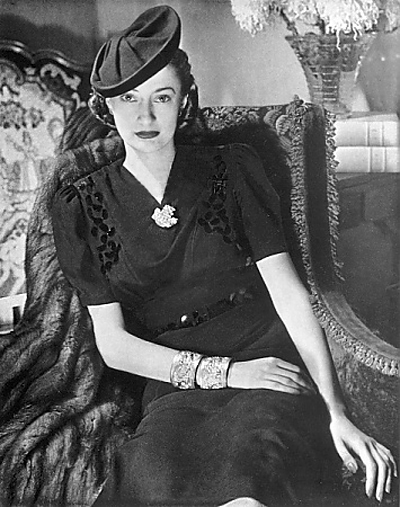
Princess Natasha Bagration

On 22 April 1944 he married Princess Natasha Bagration, a member of the Georgian royal Bagrationi dynasty, and great-great-granddaughter of Tsar Nicholas I of Russia. Her mother was Princess Tatiana Constantinovna of Russia.

Sir Charles Johnston died in London on 23 April 1986.

Preceded by Sir William Oliver	British High Commissioner to Australia; 1965–1971	Succeeded by Sir Morrice James
