= Independent bookstore =

Retail bookstore which is independently owned

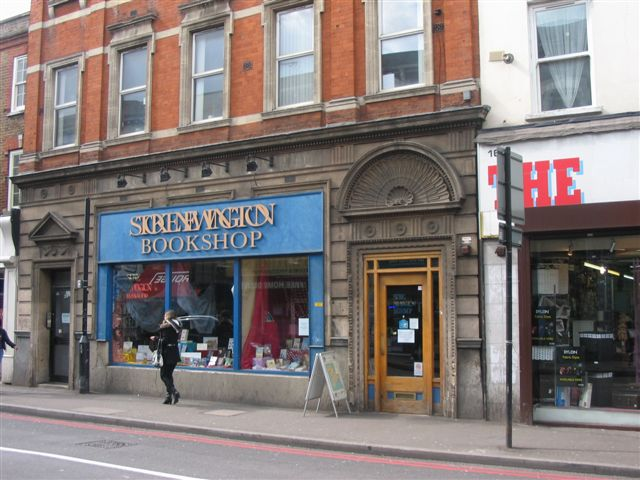
An independent bookshop in Stoke Newington, London

An independent bookstore is a retail bookstore which is independently owned. Usually, independent stores consist of only a single actual store (although there are some multi-store independents). They may be structured as sole proprietorships, closely held corporations or partnerships, cooperatives, or nonprofits. Independent stores can be contrasted with chain bookstores, which have many locations and are owned by corporations which often have divisions in other lines besides bookselling. Specialty stores such as comic book shops tend to be independent.

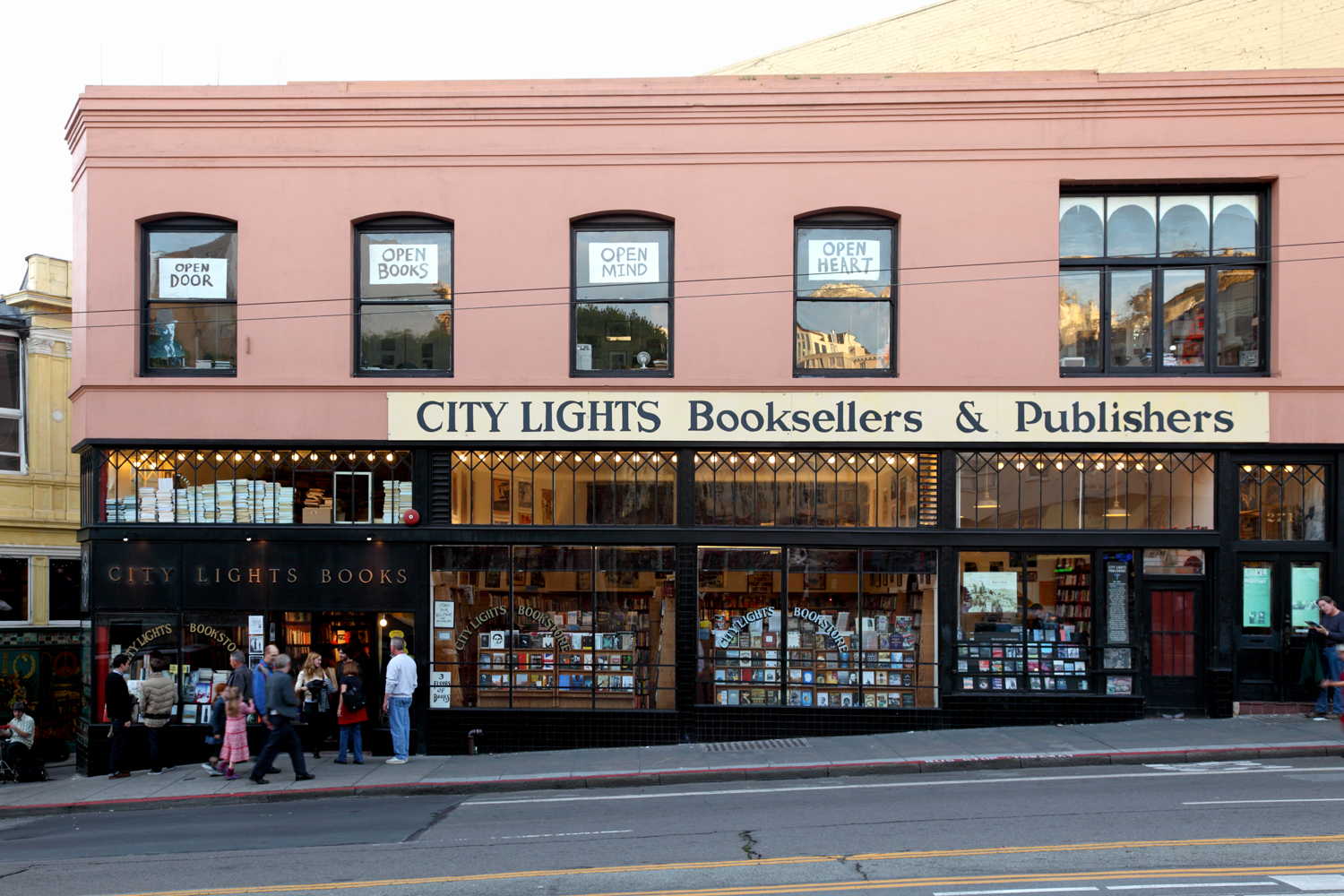
City Lights Bookstore in San Francisco, 2010

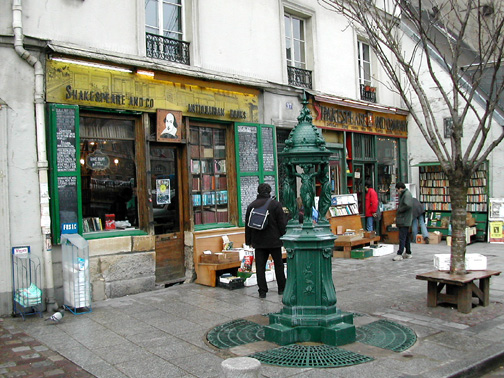
Shakespeare and Company in Paris 2004

Author events at independent bookstores sometimes take the role of literary salons and independents historically supported new authors and independent presses.

== U.S. decline and renaissance ==
For most of the 20th century, almost all bookstores in the United States were independent. In the 1950s, automobiles and suburban shopping malls became more common. Mall-based bookstore chains began in the 1960s, and underwent a major number expansion in the 1970s and 1980s, especially B. Dalton and Waldenbooks. Big-box stores also expanded during this period, including Barnes & Noble (which also acquired Texas chain Bookstop), Borders, and Crown Books. Amazon was founded during the dot-com boom in 1994 and exclusively sold books until 1998.

By the 1990s, these competitive pressures had put independent bookstores under considerable financial pressure and many closed due to their inability to compete. Closures in the United States include Kroch's and Brentano's (1995) in Chicago, Gotham Book Mart (2006) in New York, Cody's Books (2008) in Berkeley, Kepler's Books (2005) in Menlo Park, Printers Inc. Bookstore (2001) in Palo Alto, A Clean Well-Lighted Place for Books (2006) in San Francisco, Midnight Special Bookstore (2004) in Santa Monica, Dutton's Books (2008) in Los Angeles, Coliseum Books (2007) in New York City, and Wordsworth Books (2004) in Cambridge. The number of independent booksellers in the United States dropped 40% from 1995 to 2000.

In the 2000s, e-books started to take market share away from printed books, either published directly via the World Wide Web, or read on e-ink devices such as the Amazon Kindle, introduced in 2007. Amazon continued to gain significant market share, and these competitive pressures resulted in a collapse of the chain stores in the 2010s. Crown closed in 2001; Borders, B. Dalton, and Waldenbooks were liquidated in 2010-11. A smaller Barnes & Noble, with its Nook e-reader was left as the only nation-wide chain, with the second-largest Books-A-Million operating in only 32 states. This collapse created an opening for the return of more independent shops.

According to the American Booksellers Association, the number of independent U.S. bookstores increased 35%, from 1,651 in 2009 to 2,227 in 2015. A Harvard Business School study by professor Ryan Raffaelli attributed this increase to the buy local movement and success in curation of interesting titles and hosting book-oriented community events. The market has bifurcated between consumers looking for a highly interactive experience at local stores and consumers looking for low-cost, high-selection stores where large chains compete with difficulty against online sales.

In 2023 it was announced that about 17 businesses Vermont will donate their sales to help Bear Pond Books in Montpelier, Vermont and Next Chapter Bookstore in Barre. They include Bennington Bookshop, Bennington, The Book Nook, Ludlow, Norwich Bookstore, Norwich, Vermont Book Shop, Middlebury, and Rootstock Publishing, Montpelier.

== Types ==
=== African-American ===
African-American bookstores, also known as black bookstores, are bookstores owned and operated by African Americans. These stores often, although not always, specialize in works by and about African Americans and their target customers are often African Americans. Although they are a variety of African-American business, African-American bookstores have often been closely tied to radical political movements including Marxism, Black Power, and pan-Africanism. The first documented African-American bookstore was established by the abolitionist David Ruggles in 1834. The first African-American bookstore to open in Harlem was Young's Book Exchange. One of the earliest African-American bookstores to achieve national prominence was Lewis Michaux's African National Memorial Bookstore, which operated in Harlem from the early 1930s to the middle of the 1970s. Michaux's store doubled as a meeting place for black activists, including most famously Malcolm X. The Black Power movement embraced black-owned bookstores in the 1960s and 70s as vehicles for promoting their ideology and creating radical political spaces in black communities across the United States. By the 1990s, African-American bookstores earned significant attention from more politically moderate and business oriented media outlets such as the magazine Black Enterprise. In the 2000s and 2010s, however, as independent bookstores of all kinds declined and bookstores chains and Amazon increasingly sold black-authored books, the number of African-American bookstores declined rapidly, dropping from more than 250 to just over 70.

Historical black booksellers include Lewis H. Micheaux, Martin Sostre, and David Ruggles. Historical black bookstores include Young's Book Exchange.

Prominent black-owned booksellers currently in business include Marcus Books in Oakland, the oldest black bookseller in the country, Everyone's Place in Baltimore, Hakim's Bookstore in Philadelphia, Eso Won Books in Los Angeles (noted as "a Leimert Park institution of black literature and culture"), and Sankofa in Washington, D.C.

Prominent online black booksellers include AALBC.com (founded in 1998), Mahogany Books and Hue-Man Bookstore, which formerly had brick-and-mortar storefronts in Denver, Colorado, and in Harlem.

=== Antiquarian ===
Some bookstores specialize in old and out of print books.

=== Feminist ===
Feminist bookstores sell material relating to women's issues, gender, and sexuality.

=== Infoshops ===
Infoshops are places in which people can access anarchist or autonomist ideas.

=== LGBT ===
Some stores focus on the LGBT community and literature.

=== Science fiction, fantasy and horror ===
Beginning in the 1970s, with the popularity of J.R.R. Tolkien's The Lord of the Rings series, a variety of independent bookstores specializing in science fiction, fantasy, horror, and related genres (often mystery, comics, games, and/or collectibles), began opening. Among the first were Andromeda Books in Birmingham, England (1971-2002), Bakka-Phoenix Bookstore in Toronto and A Change of Hobbit in Southern California, both established in 1972. As independent bookstores suffered during the business shifts of the late 20th and early 21st century, many of these closed. During their heyday, however, they were a key part of science fiction fandom, facilitating not just publishing, distribution, and promotion of books, but public events, social events, and community-building.

=== Religious ===
Some shops specialize in religious literature.

=== Used ===
Some shops focus on reselling used books.

=== Pop-up retail ===
Is a trend of opening short-term sales spaces that last for days to weeks before closing down, often to latch onto a fad or scheduled event. Like the Morioka Shoten bookshop in Ginza, Tokyo, best known for its concept of offering a single book for sale each week —actually several copies of the same book—

== Portrayal in film ==
Two documentary films, Indies Under Fire (2006) and Paperback Dreams (2008), explore the difficulties faced by U.S. independent bookstores in the new economy.

The competition between chain and independent retailers was fictionalized in the 1998 film You've Got Mail.

== See also ==
- List of independent bookstores
- Bookselling
- Bookshop.org
- Libro.fm
- Books in the United States
