= What the Dormouse Said =

2005 non-fiction book by John Markoff

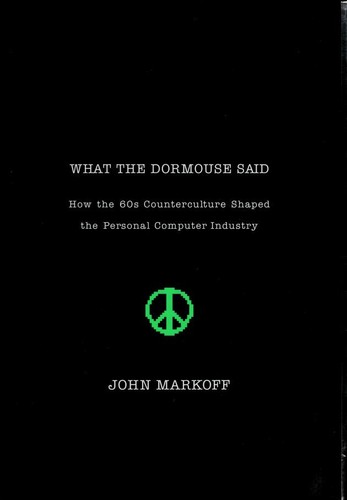
- Author: John Markoff
- Language: English
- Publisher: Viking Press
- Publication date: 2005
- Media type: Print (book)
- Pages: 310
- ISBN: 0-670-03382-0
- OCLC: 57068812
- Dewey Decimal: 004.16 22
- LC Class: QA76.17 .M37 2005

What the Dormouse Said: How the Sixties Counterculture Shaped the Personal Computer Industry, is a 2005 non-fiction book by John Markoff. The book details the history of the personal computer, closely tying the ideologies of the collaboration-driven, World War II-era defense research community to the embryonic cooperatives and psychedelics use of the American counterculture of the 1960s.

The book follows the history chronologically, beginning with Vannevar Bush's description of his inspirational memex machine in his 1945 article "As We May Think". Markoff describes many of the people and organizations who helped develop the ideology and technology of the computer as we know it today, including Doug Engelbart, Xerox PARC, Apple Computer and Microsoft Windows.

Markoff argues for a direct connection between the counterculture of the late 1950s and 1960s (using examples such as Kepler's Books in Menlo Park, California) and the development of the computer industry. The book also discusses the early split between the idea of commercial and free-supply computing.

The main part of the title, "What the Dormouse Said," is a reference to a line at the end of the 1967 Jefferson Airplane song "White Rabbit": "Remember what the dormouse said: feed your head." which is itself a reference to Lewis Carroll's Alice's Adventures in Wonderland.

== See also ==
- Hackers: Heroes of the Computer Revolution
- Midpeninsula Free University
- Homebrew Computer Club
- The Soul of a New Machine
- Microserfs
- Steve Jobs
- Fire in the Valley
