= Printers Inc. Bookstore =

Former bookstore in California

Coordinates: 37.4274°N 122.1444°W

- Type: Private subsidiary
- Founded: 1978
- Founder: Jerry Shurtleff (co-founder)
- Defunct: 2001
- Fate: Out of Business
- Headquarters: 310 California Ave, Palo Alto, CA; 301 Castro Street, Mountain View, CA
- Number of locations: 2
- Area served: Palo Alto, Stanford, Mountain View, Menlo Park, California, United States
- Key people: Susan MacDonald and Gerry Masteller (to 1999); Matthew Duran (to 2001)
- Products: Books; Magazines
- Website: pibooks.com (Historic)

Printers Inc. Bookstore (1978–2001) was an independent bookstore in Palo Alto and Mountain View, California, that closed in 2001.

== History ==
In 1978, five Kepler's Books alumni (including Jeffrey Shurtleff and Anne Leathers) founded Printers Inc. Bookstore. The original Palo Alto store at 310 California Avenue occupied a former thrift store location. A second store was located at 301 Castro Street in Mountain View, California. Printers Inc. Bookstore was also a popular destination for Stanford University students. The Printers Inc. Cafe originally shared space in the California Avenue branch in Palo Alto and subsequently moved next door. American author Frances Mayes describes this history in her 2006 memoir, A Year in the World: Journeys of a Passionate Traveller:

Susan and Kate, with their friend Jeffrey, then opened Printers Inc., a literary bookstore on California Avenue in Palo Alto. They installed a coffee bar/cafe, which was revolutionary. No other bookstore in California, or maybe the United States, had done that in 1978. We were sipping cappuccinos and reading Merwin at Printers long before Starbucks ever pulled an espresso. The bookstore for its whole life was a fulcrum for the entire community and surroundings. Meet me at Printers. Eventually they expanded into an adjacent building for a larger cafe. The reading series was stellar. They opened a second store.

In the early 1990s, chain bookstores such as Borders and Barnes & Noble began to compete with independent bookstores such as Printers Inc. The rise of Amazon.com also affected Printers Inc. and other independent bookstores. Thus, in December 1998, Printers Inc. announced that it would be closing. The local community protested the closing, however, as the owners began to search for a new partner. In March 1999 Printers Inc. was resurrected under new management. This management lasted until 2001 when Printers Inc. Bookstore closed for good. The Printers Inc. Cafe, however, did not close as it is under different management.

After Printers Inc. closed its doors in Mountain View, Books Inc. took over the old location on Castro Street to open one of their own branches in 2001. In 2016 they moved a few doors down to 317 Castro Street.

== Documentary ==
The 2006 documentary Indies Under Fire tells the story of Printers Inc. and other independent bookstores affected by the new economy. Director Jacob Bricca stated that he made the documentary after Printers Inc. closed: "I took the [store's closing] very personally ... I grew up in Palo Alto and spent many hours reading and hanging out at Printers Inc. I saw the strong connection the community had to the bookstore and, like others in the film, was very distressed at its closing."

== Cultural Impact ==
Printers Inc is referenced in sonnets 8.13–8.16 of Vikram Seth's 1986 novel, The Golden Gate.

== Photographs ==
- Photograph of Printers Inc. Bookstore in Palo Alto
- Photographs of Printers Inc. Bookstore - Palo Alto Historical Association
- Photographs inside Printers Inc. Bookstore

== See also ==
- Cody's Books
- Kepler's Books
