= Onegin stanza =

Verse form by Russian poet Alexander Pushkin

Onegin stanza (Russian: онегинская строфа oneginskaya strofa), sometimes "Pushkin sonnet", refers to the verse form popularized (or invented) by the Russian poet Alexander Pushkin through his 1825–1832 novel in verse Eugene Onegin. The work was mostly written in verses of iambic tetrameter with the rhyme scheme $\mathrm{aBaBccDDeFFeGG}$, where the lowercase letters represent feminine rhymes (stressed on the penultimate syllable) and the uppercase representing masculine rhymes (stressed on the ultimate syllable). For example, here is the first stanza of Onegin as rendered into English by Charles Johnston:

My uncle—high ideals inspire him;
but when past joking he fell sick,
he really forced one to admire him—
and never played a shrewder trick.
Let others learn from his example!
But God, how deadly dull to sample
sickroom attendance night and day
and never stir a foot away!
And the sly baseness, fit to throttle,
of entertaining the half-dead:
one smoothes the pillows down in bed,
and glumly serves the medicine bottle,
and sighs, and asks oneself all through:
"When will the devil come for you?"

In Russian poetry following Pushkin, the form has been utilized by authors as diverse as Mikhail Lermontov, Vyacheslav Ivanov, Jurgis Baltrušaitis and Valery Pereleshin, in genres ranging from one-stanza lyrical piece to voluminous autobiography.

John Fuller's 1980 "The Illusionists" and Jon Stallworthy's 1987 "The Nutcracker" used this stanza form, and Vikram Seth's 1986 novel The Golden Gate is written wholly in Onegin stanzas.

In an illuminating passage (Stanzas 5.1 to 5.5 of the Golden Gate) Vikram Seth explains how he got inspired by reading Eugene Onegin to write a verse novel in English, using the same iambic tetrameter with the masculine and feminine scheme delineated above. The fourth stanza (5.4) of his passage from the Golden Gate alludes to the poem Hudibras by Samuel Butler in tetrameter, lamenting the huge dominance of the pentameter in English poetry.

Why asks a friend, attempt a tetrameter?
Because it once was noble, yet
Capers before the proud pentameter
Tyrant of English, I regret
To see this marvellous swift meter
Demean its heritage and peter
Into mere Hudibrastic tricks
Unapostolic knacks and knicks
But why take all this quite so badly?
I would not, had I world and time
To wait for reason, rhythm and rhyme
To reassert themselves. But sadly
The time is not remote when I
Will not be here to wait. That's why.

The Onegin stanza is also used in the verse novel Equinox by Australian writer Matthew Rubinstein, serialized daily in the Sydney Morning Herald and subsequently published in 2013; in the biography in verse Richard Burgin by Diana Burgin; in the verse novel Jack the Lady Killer by HRF Keating (title borrowed from a line in Golden Gate in Onegin stanza rhymes but not always preserving the metric pattern); in several poems by Australian poet Gwen Harwood, for instance the first part of "Class of 1927" and "Sea Eagle" (the first employs a humorous Byronic tone, but the second adapts the stanza to a spare lyrical mood, which is good evidence of the form's versatility); and in the verse novel "Unholyland" by Aidan Andrew Dun. The British writer Andy Croft has written two novels in Onegin stanzas, Ghost Writer and 1948. Brad Walker used the form for his 2019 novella Adam and Rosamond, a parody of Victorian fiction, Michael Weingrad uses it for his 2024 novel of coming of age in early 1980's Philadelphia, Eugene Nadelman.

Some stanzaic forms, written in iambic tetrameter in the poetry of Vladimír Holan, especially in the poems "První testament" and "Cesta mraku", were surely inspired by Onegin stanza.
