= Indies Under Fire =

Indies Under Fire: The Battle for the American Bookstore
- Directed by: Jacob Bricca
- Produced by: Jacob Bricca
- Starring: Printers Inc. Bookstore
- Edited by: Jacob Bricca
- Release date: August 2006
- Running time: 56 minutes
- Country: United States
- Language: English

Indies Under Fire: The Battle for the American Bookstore (2006) is an American documentary film which chronicles the difficulties faced by independent bookstores in the information economy. The Palo Alto based Printers Inc. Bookstore which closed in 2001 is the primary focus of the film. It also explores the impact of Borders moving into two small towns filled with independent bookstores: Capitola, California and Santa Cruz, California.

Director Jacob Bricca stated that he was inspired to make the documentary in response to the closing of Printers Inc. Bookstore: "I took the [store's closing] very personally [...] I grew up in Palo Alto and spent many hours reading and hanging out at Printers Inc. I saw the strong connection the community had to the bookstore and, like others in the film, was very distressed at its closing."

== Honors ==
- Official Selection - Wine Country Film Festival
- Official Selection - Newburyport Documentary Film Festival

== See also ==
- Paperback Dreams
