= Young's Book Exchange =

Young’s Book Exchange is known as the first African-American bookstore. It was located at 135 West 135th Street in New York City. It was founded in 1915 by George Young, who was a Pullman porter during the 1900s, and became a bibliophile of African-American literature. His bookstore was known as the "Mecca of Literature" for African-American citizens. This bookstore housed approximately 8,000–10,000 volumes.

== About the founder ==
George Young was born in Virginia to two slaves recently freed. He later married Ellen Thomas Young and had a daughter, Sara Elizabeth Young. Young was a Pullman porter, hired to work on the railroads as a porter on sleeping cars. He was known to many different people all over the world, one friend being Frederick Douglass. Young was also the national treasurer of the John Brown Memorial Association and the superintendent of St. Mark's Methodist Episcopal Church Sunday School. Young died following a heart attack at the age of 65 in St. Luke's Hospital.

== Collection ==
Books by African authors included the older Letters of Ignatius Sancho and the Life of Olaudah Equiano or Gustavus Vassa. Beside these were more recent treatises: Duse Mohamed, In the Land of the Pharaohs; Sol T. Plaatje, Native Life in South Africa; J. E. Casely Hayford, Ethiopia Unbound, Gold Coast Native Institutions, and The Truth About the West African Land Question; Dr. James Africanus Beale Horton, West African Countries and Peoples and A Vindication of the African Race; John Mensah Sarbah, Fanti Customary Laws; Bishop Samuel Adjai Crowther, Journal of an Expedition Up the Niger and Tshadda Rivers; Prof. Benjamin Brawley of Howard University, A Social History of the American Negro; George W. Williams, History of the Negro Race in America; William Wells Brown, The Black Man, His Antecedents, His Genius, and His Achievements and The Rising Son; W. E. B. Du Bois, The Negro; Joel Augustus Rogers, Superman to Man.
