= Paperback Dreams =

2008 documentary film

- Directed by: Alex Beckstead
- Starring: Kepler's Books; Cody's Books
- Theme music composer: Nathan Grover
- Country of origin: United States
- Original language: English

Production
- Producer: Alex Beckstead
- Editor: Gail Huddleson

Original release
- Release: October 18, 2008

Paperback Dreams is a 2008 television documentary film about the fate of bookstores in the new economy, that was part of the KQED (San Francisco's PBS station) documentary film series, Truly CA. It is "the story of two landmark independent bookstores and their struggle to survive. The film follows Andy Ross, owner of Cody's Books, and Clark Kepler, owner of Kepler's Books, over the course of two tumultuous years in the book business."

Publishers Weekly notes that Beckstead became interested in the topic after becoming a "fan" of Cody's and Kepler's. While working in Menlo Park, California, he frequently shopped at Kepler's. Beckstead stated: "When I heard Kepler's was closing [briefly in 2005], I was shocked: it's in one of the most affluent, educated cities in America—just 15 minutes from Stanford University—and it made me realize that if an independent bookstore couldn't survive there, there must be a larger story." After making the documentary, Beckstead stated that he discovered "four elements essential to the survival of an independent bookstore: Own your own building [...] Hire experienced staff [...] Sell used books [...] Figure out some way to sell books online."

== Screenings ==
Paperback Dreams aired on PBS stations beginning in November 2008. It was previously screened at Book Expo America on May 31, 2008. and at the Oakland Museum of California (presented jointly with the Oakland Film Office) on August 1, 2008.

== See also ==
- Indies Under Fire
