= Bookshop (company) =

Online bookselling site

Bookshop.org
- Industry: E-commerce, Ebook
- Founded: January 2020
- Founder: Andy Hunter
- Headquarters: United States
- Area served: United States and United Kingdom
- Website: bookshop.org

Bookshop.org is an online book marketplace launched in January 2020. Its stated mission is "to financially support local, independent bookstores".

Bookshop, Inc., a privately held company, has been certified as a B Corporation.

== History ==
Bookshop.org was founded by Andy Hunter, who had previously co-founded Literary Hub and Electric Literature. Hunter started working on the idea in 2018.

The American Booksellers Association endorsed the company in 2019. As of February 2023, 70% of its members were affiliated with Bookshop.org.

After launching the site in January 2020, the business grew significantly during the COVID-19 pandemic.

On November 2, 2020, Bookshop.org opened a branch in the United Kingdom in partnership with wholesaler Gardners Books, which runs a similar profit sharing program with independent bookshops in that country.

As of January 2025, Bookshop.org says they have generated more than $35 million for local stores. In 2023, Bookshop.org replaced IndieBound as the American Booksellers Association's official platform for supporting independent, local bookstores when linking to books online. As of 2023, Bookshop.org's booksales were about 1% of Amazon's, according to Hunter. Hunter had set 1% or 2% of Amazon's sales as a goal as early as 2020.

In January 2025, the company started selling e-books. With the model being, "Bookstores can use the platform to sell ebooks directly to customers, and when they make a sale, the store gets all of the money. Customers can also browse all of the ebooks for sale on the website, then choose which bookstore to support with their purchase. In that case as well, the chosen bookstore gets all the money."

== Model ==
Bookshop.org, conceived as a response to Amazon's industry dominance, offers an online storefront with the accessibility and convenience of Amazon and, by convincing media outlets that review and advertise books to link to Bookshop.org instead through higher commissions and emphasis on its mission, intercept potential Amazon customers. Bookshop.org, operating on an affiliate marketing model, receives and fulfills orders for independent booksellers through its online storefront and returns 30% off the cover price to the bookseller. Bookshop.org lets authors, publishers, and reviewers also sign up as affiliates and take home 10%. Any purchases made directly on Bookshop (through an affiliate store or not) see 10% of sales go into a pool to be split up among independent booksellers.

In 2020, Bookshop.org started partnering with audiobook site Libro.fm to direct Bookshop customers looking for audiobooks to buy directly on Libro's website. In July 2026, Bookshop.org introduced a subscription audiobook service through which its UK customers could directly buy audiobooks from their site, listening via their website or app.

In 2023, Bookshop.org started to publish works to be available exclusively through their website and independent bookstores.

== Reception ==
At launch, some independent booksellers and independent publishers expressed concern that Bookshop.org was, rather than a benefit to them, a new long-term competitor in the publishing ecosystem, as booksellers received a smaller commission through Bookshop.org than if the customer bought directly from the bookseller. Other booksellers and authors, however, praised the effort citing the desire to have an alternative to Amazon for buying books online that supported local bookstores. Time Magazine wrote that the pandemic helped to silence some critics by providing support to independent booksellers when in-person shopping was not an option for many people.
