= Ira Sandperl =

Anti-war activist and educator (1923–2013)

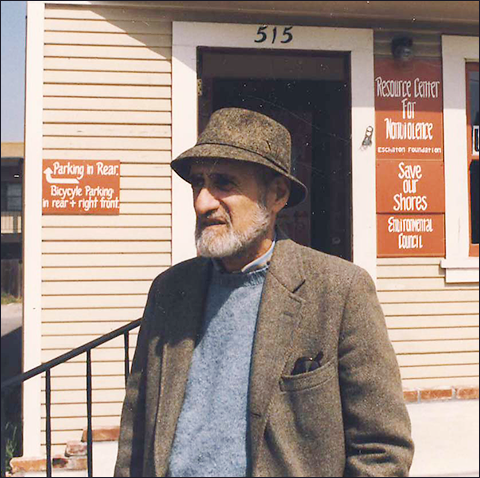
- Ira Sandperl standing outside of the Resource Center for Nonviolence.
- Born: March 11, 1923; St. Louis, Missouri US
- Died: April 13, 2013 (aged 90); Menlo Park, California, US
- Occupations: American anti-war activist and educator

Ira Sandperl (March 11, 1923 – April 13, 2013) was an American anti-war activist and educator. A proponent of nonviolence, he influenced students and heroes of the anti-war, civil rights, and peace movements, including Martin Luther King Jr., David Harris, Bob Dylan, John Lennon, Lawrence Ferlinghetti, Allen Ginsberg, Daniel Ellsberg, Thomas Merton, and Joan Baez with whom he formed the Institute for the Study of Non-violence. Sandperl became a national figure in the antiwar movement of the 1960s, according to New York Times reporter and longtime friend John Markoff.

Sandperl was born in St. Louis, Missouri and raised in a Jewish household by Harry and Ione Sandperl. His father was a surgeon and his mother was a follower of Norman Thomas, leading Sandperl early on to be exposed to both socialist and pacifist ideals. He attended Stanford University but dropped out after World War II began. His attempt to join the armed forces in the ambulance corps was denied because of a childhood bout with polio.

As a student at Stanford he tried to generate sympathy among the faculty for the Japanese-Americans in concentration camps. After Stanford he left for Mexico, returning after World War II to Palo Alto where he taught meditation and Sunday school classes at the Palo Alto Friend's Church, and lectured at Stanford. In 1955 he was hired at Kepler's Books as the very first employee. He engaged customers on political topics as well as giving advice on literature, and introduced a generation of draft-age men to nonviolence during the Vietnam War.

Sandperl was a longtime resident of Palo Alto and Menlo Park, where he was an oracular presence at Kepler's bookstore, Peninsula School and other venues in the Stanford area, and influenced many young people who grew up in his community in the 1950's and 1960's, including Joan Baez and John Markoff.

== Social and political involvement ==
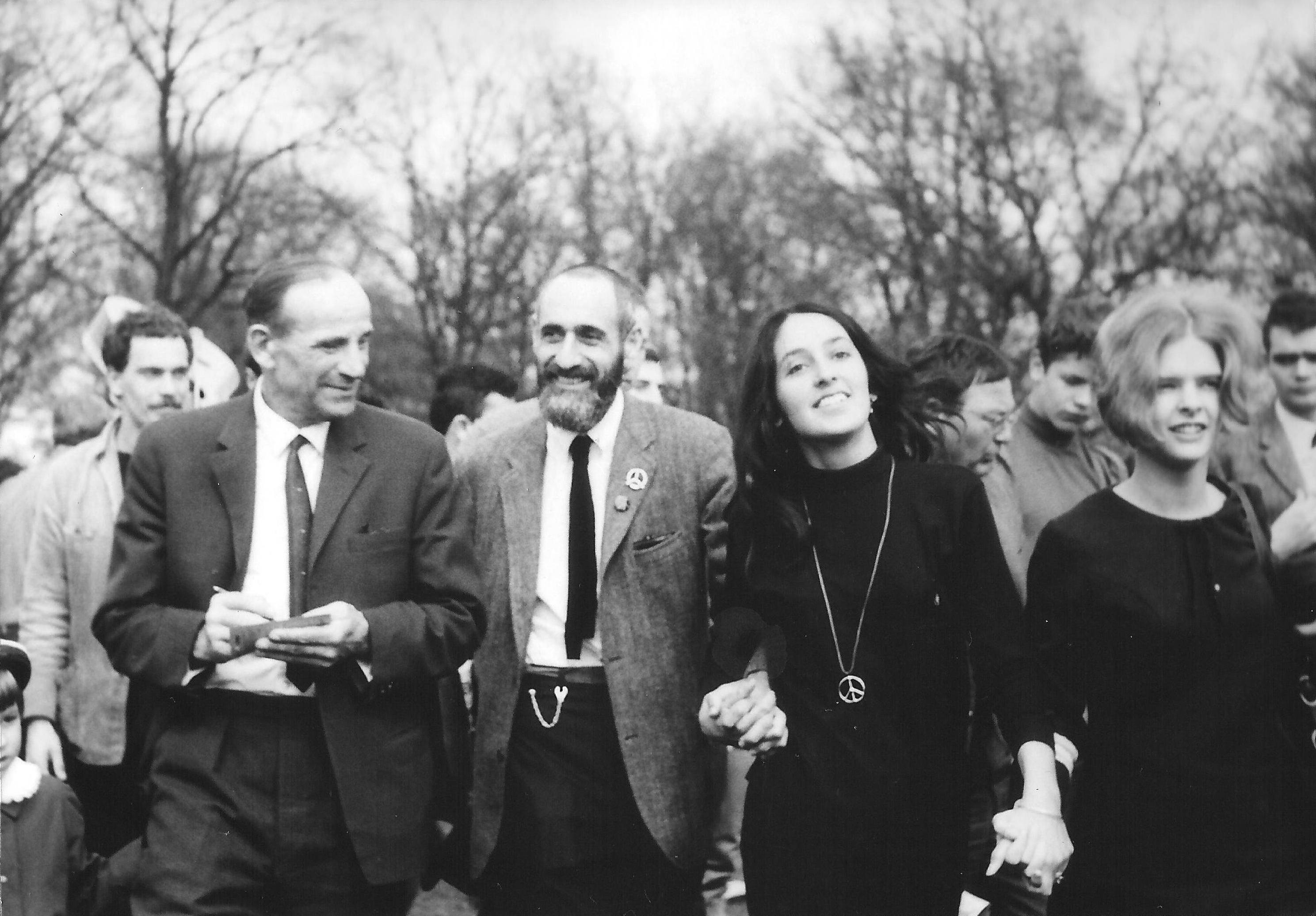
Joan Baez and Sandperl at Ostermarsch 1966 to Frankfurt.

In his life, Sandperl worked with leaders of the Free Speech movement at the University of California, Berkeley, the civil rights movement, the Vietnam War peace movement, and the Irish peace movement during The Troubles. In the Bay Area, he was a fixture at Kepler's, a bookstore near Stanford that became a center of counterculture, drawing the youth and students at nearby universities to listen to his ideas of non-violence and fascination with Mahatma Gandhi. He influenced many of the students of the Stanford area Vietnam war resistance league now known as the April Third Movement.

Protesting at a Quaker meeting in Palo Alto in 1959, urging them to refuse payment of war taxes, Sandperl met Joan Baez when she was a senior in high school, and through their interests in various philosophies and political causes they developed a friendship. In 1965 they founded together the Institute for the Study of Non-violence in Carmel Valley, California with Sandperl running the general operations and funding coming from Baez. The school invited a small number of students each year (in order of applications received) to learn the principles of nonviolence, partake in readings, meditation, and discussion. Some local residents of Carmel were frustrated by the image that the school represented and fought the school from continuing operations. The episode is recounted in Joan Didion's essay "Where the Kissing Never Stops", first published in 1966 under the title "Just Folks at a School for Non-Violence" in The New York Times Magazine and reprinted in her 1968 essay collection Slouching Towards Bethlehem.

In 1966, Sandperl accompanied Baez to Grenada, Mississippi to join in a campaign to help desegregate local schools with Martin Luther King Jr. Two years later King visited them in Santa Rita prison, where the two served 45 day sentences for trying to shut down the Oakland, California draft induction center for "Stop the Draft Week." King said that he made the visit "because they helped me so much in the South." King also famously sent members of his organization, the Southern Christian Leadership Conference, to study with Ira on the subjects of organizing and non-violent tactics.

The nationally famous catholic monk and non-violent activist, Thomas Merton, met with Sandperl and Baez in December 1966 at the Abbey of Gethsemani in Kentucky where he lived. Their discussions strongly influenced Merton and his changing philosophy of activism despite being a monk and he wrote about them in his journals and his book New Seeds of Contemplation. Merton also kept up with Sandperl through correspondence during his travels through Asia from 1966 through 1967 and considered Sandperl an authority on Gandhi's teachings of non-violence.

In 1968, Sandperl, Joan Baez and David Harris organized a nation-wide speaking tour to urge draft age men to refuse induction. Harris, mentored by Sandperl, had emerged as the national leader of student resistance to the draft, and would go to prison in 1969 for refusing induction himself. He had also been married to Joan Baez. Their child was born while Harris was serving 20 months of his three-year sentence in federal correctional institutions in Arizona and Texas.

In 1971, at the height of resistance to Nixon's continuation of the war, Sandperl had just finished speaking against the war in Cambridge, MA when an unknown man approached him with questions about how to survive incarceration if one was arrested for war resistance. Sandperl, who had served 45 days for blocking the induction center in Oakland, CA, advised him that it could be managed, and it was even possible to organize among the other prisoners if one took care not to be disruptive, because the guards just didn't want any trouble. The unknown man Daniel Ellsberg told Sandberg that he had been strongly influenced by a talk given by Randy Kehler, a young anti-war activist mentored by Sandperl who had been sentenced to prison for refusing draft induction. On June 13, 1971, Ellsberg's face and the Pentagon Papers he had leaked were on the front page of the New York Times, and the resistance had landed its most solid blow yet against the war machine.

== Philosophy ==
Sandperl was a proponent of Gandhi's philosophy of nonviolence. Sandperl's expression of it is simple: "The means determine the ends."

We are deceived into believing that we can get the kind of world we seek by doing the very things we are trying to get rid of. "Just a little more violence to end violence." "Just a little more hatred to end hatred." "Just a little more oppression to end oppression" -- and on and on.

We are taken in because good people are doing these things, sincere and brave people. And this is why the finer their qualities, the more dangerous they are, the more thoroughly we are fooled.

All the finest qualities in the world cannot change the simple, immutable fact that the ends cannot justify the means, but, on the contrary, the means determine the ends. In all of man's history this stands out clearly and intellectually indisputable; yet it has been perversely, insistently, sentimentally and tragically ignored. In this universe the means always and everywhere, without doubt and without exception, cannot, in the very nature of things, but determine the ends. This cannot be repeated often enough.

We get what we do; not what we intend, dream, or desire. We simply get what we do.

If we see and act upon this (I will say again, unabashedly, what it is -- the means determine the ends!), then what the prophets of the ages have wistfully called Utopia will become a reality.

== Works ==
Sandperl is the author of A Little Kinder, with an Introduction by Joan Baez, a memoir of the civil rights and anti-war movements in the 1960's. His book is really a series of essays, in the form of journal entries sent as letters to a young friend, on the subject of how to live, what to do, and the nature of a life of critical purpose well-lived. In the manner of Montaigne, the inventor of this essay form, it discourses on Sandperl's wide-ranging passionate investments in the philosophy and practice of nonviolence, the study of political history and its dangerous characters, and his reading: he was extraordinarily well-read, worked in a bookstore and lived in a tiny apartment crammed with thousands of books. Included are his personal stories of all the characters he moved with in the movements of his time, including most of the movers, from Martin Luther King to Daniel Ellsberg. It concludes with Sandperl's annotated bibliography of recommended reading, picked from among the thousands of writers whose works influenced him.

== Death ==
Sandperl died on April 13, 2013, at his home in Menlo Park, California, surrounded by friends and his books, from complications arising from a respiratory infection. He was 90 years old. His obituary was written by John Markoff, and he was later memorialized by a large group gathered at Peninsula School who claimed him as their mentor and a major influence in their lives.

== References and further reading ==
- Sandperl, Ira (1974). A Little Kinder. Palo Alto, CA: Science and Behavior Books. ISBN 0-8314-0035-8. LCCN 73-93870.
- April Third (3 May 2024). "In Remembrance: Ira Sandperl". April Third Reunion. Stanford area: April Third Movement.
- Boyce, David (April 16, 2013). "Nonviolence champion Ira Sandperl dies at 90". The Almanac.
- Fitch, Bob (1966), "Jesse Jackson, Joan Baez, Ira Sandperl, Martin Luther King Jr., Dora McDonald (Martin Luther King Jr. secretary) annual Southern Christian Leadership Conference staff workshop", The Bob Fitch Photography Archive, Penn Center, Frogmore, SC: Stanford Libraries
- Fitch, Bob (July 1969), "David Harris talks with Ira Sandperl and others while awaiting arrest at Struggle Mountain", The Bob Fitch Photography Archive, Los Altos Hills: Stanford Libraries
- Huxley, Aldous (1937). Ends and Means: An inquiry into the nature of ideals and into the methods employed for their realization. Harper and Brothers.
- InSight Films (2023). "The Boys Who Said NO!".
- Kellogg, David (11 June 2023), "Looking Back: Joan Baez on Pins and Needles", Monterey Herald
- Kirkland, Will (14 September 2013). "A Little Kinder: An Old Friend Moves On". All In One Boat~ And Heading Through the Straits of Messina.
- KTVU (6 March 1968), Harris, Baez and Sandperl outside courtroom, Bay Area Television Archive
- KPIX-TV (6 March 1968), Press conference with Joan Baez, Ira Sandperl and David Harris, Bay Area Television Archive
- Markoff, John (2013), "Ira Sandperl - March 11, 1923 - April 13, 2013 (obituary)", April Third Movement
- Swenson, Lee (2018-03-09). "A Tribute to Ira Sandperl on his Birthday". The Boys Who Said NO! Film.
