= Midnight Special Bookstore =

Bookstore in Venice, California, United States (1970–2004)

Coordinates: 34.0136°N 118.4962°W

- Company type: Private
- Industry: Retail
- Genre: focus on left-wing politics
- Founded: Venice, California, United States (1970)
- Defunct: June 2, 2004
- Fate: Dissolved
- Headquarters: Santa Monica, California, United States
- Number of locations: 1
- Key people: Margie Ghiz, final owner
- Products: book retailer
- Website: www.msbooks.com (defunct)

The Midnight Special Bookstore was an independent bookstore in southern California. It catered to a leftist clientele. Its merchandise and events emphasized current events such as the civil rights movement, the Vietnam War, the Israeli-Palestinian conflict, the Chinese democracy movement and U.S. intervention in Afghanistan and Iraq.

== History ==
Founded in 1970 as a co-op in Venice, the shop "was run predominantly by volunteers" until around 1985.

In 1980 it moved from Venice to 1350 Third Street (also known as 1350 Santa Monica Mall) in Santa Monica, then in 1992 moved again to 1318 Third Street Promenade. For more than ten years, the mall's landlord charged the shop less rent than other tenants were paying, but with a change in management and success in attracting upscale tenants, the mall operator asked for an increase that would "more than double" the rent. For this reason, the bookstore moved out of its Third Street location in March 2003. Its stock was kept in storage for eight months. In November 2003, the store reopened at 1450 Second Street in Santa Monica, then finally closed around June 2, 2004. Its owner cited weak sales and continuing financial difficulties as the reason for closing:

Unfortunately, the delay was too great and our debts grew with the delays. Only local outlets of major chains can afford the losses that come with opening stores; even though our sales were steadily growing, it was not fast enough to keep us going until we could sustain ourselves.

Authors who appeared at the shop:

- Cecilia Brainard
- Octavia Butler
- bell hooks
- Paulo Coelho
- Slavoj Žižek
- Eduardo Galeano
- Viggo Mortensen
- Dave Eggers
- Elaine Brown
- Lalo Alcaraz
- Walter Mosley
- Trinh Minh-ha
- Edward Said
- Junko Mizuno
- Margaret Randall
- Maya Angelou
- Tariq Ali
- Michael Ventura
- Paul Krassner
- Tavis Smiley
- consumer advocate David Horowitz
- Bernadette Devlin

Among other people who made appearances at the shop were filmmakers Robert Greenwald and Oliver Stone, actor David Warshofsky, Elaine Brown of the Black Panther Party, UCLA professor Khaled Abou El Fadl; and musicians Dave Marsh, Jello Biafra, Frank Zappa and Ray Manzarek.
