= Libro.fm =

Audiobook app

- Company type: Social purpose corporation
- Founded: 2014
- Headquarters: Seattle, Washington
- Area served: United States, Canada, United Kingdom, Australia, New Zealand
- Website: libro.fm

Libro.fm is an audiobook app that splits its profits with an independent bookstore of the customer's choosing. In 2022, the company's publicity director Albee Romero told The Orange County Register that half of all profits go to the selected independent bookshop. It has created apps for Android, iPhone, and Apple Watch and is free of digital rights management, meaning all books can be downloaded on other devices without restrictions.

The Seattle-based company is employee-owned and a social purpose corporation.

== History ==
In 2014, Libro.fm was co-founded by Mark Pearson (CEO), Carl Hartung (CTO), and Nick Johnson (creative director).

In 2020, Libro.fm expanded beyond the U.S. and into Canada. In 2020, Libro also partnered with Bookshop.org to direct its customers looking for audiobooks to buy directly from Libro.fm.

In 2023, Libro.fm expanded into the UK, Australia, and New Zealand and began to accept payments in EUR, AUD, GBP and NZD.

== See also ==
- Hoopla
- Libby
