= Hakim's Bookstore =

Bookstore in Philadelphia, Pennsylvania

Hakim's Bookstore, established in 1959 as Hakim's House of Knowledge Bookstore, is the first and oldest Black-owned bookstore in Philadelphia, Pennsylvania. It is located at 210 S 52nd Street in West Philadelphia.

The store was designated as a Pennsylvania historic landmark in 2023.

== History ==
Hakim's Bookstore was founded by Dawud Hakim. Hakim, a former post office employee, was inspired to share information about Black history after reading 100 Amazing Facts About the Negro by J.A. Rogers (1934). Prior to opening the store, Hakim sold books out his car.

Hakim died in 1997. His daughter, Yvonne Blake, and other family members continued to operate the store.

Hakim's nearly closed in 2014, but was saved following an outpouring of support resulting from a 2015 feature article in The Philadelphia Inquirer.

The physical store closed temporarily during the COVID-19 pandemic, but continued to sell books through its website. Web sales increased significantly during the Black Lives Matter protests that occurred following the murder of George Floyd.

Hakim's was named a “Champion Black Business” by ESPN in 2021 and was designated as a Pennsylvania historic landmark in 2023.
