= Morioka Shoten =

Bookshop in Tokyo, Japan

General information
- Location: Suzuki Building 1-28-15 Ginza, Chūō-ku, Tokyo, Japan
- Opened: 5 de mayo de 2015
- Owner: Yoshiyuki Morioka

Website
- www.instagram.com/moriokashoten

Morioka Shoten (Japanese: 森岡書店) is a bookshop located in the Ginza district of Tokyo, Japan. It is best known for its concept of offering a single book for sale each week —actually several copies of the same book— described by the philosophy of issatsu, isshitsu, "one room, one book".

It is located on the ground floor of the Suzuki Building, constructed in 1929 and protected as architectural heritage. Between the 1930s and the end of the Second World War, this building housed the Nippon Kobo publishing house, responsible for the magazine Nippon, founded by photographer Ihei Kimura.

== History ==
Morioka Shoten was opened on 5 May 2015 by Yoshiyuki Morioka, a bookseller who ran several traditional and second-hand bookshops for many years before coming up with the idea that a bookshop could be run with only one title for sale.

Each week, the shop selects a single title, multiple copies of the selected book are made available, and the interior of the shop is organized with art exhibitions or objects related to the book's content. Meetings and talks with authors are also held, allowing direct interaction between buyers and creators of the work. The shop is described as a cross between a bookshop, a contemporary art gallery and a pop-up shop, generating interest among visitors and international media for its unusual approach.

The bookshop is open from Tuesday to Sunday, closed on Mondays, and changes the titles in its catalogue every six days. Among the titles that have been exhibited, Japanese authors abound, but Hans Christian Andersen and Tove Jansson have also featured.

The shop’s visual identity was designed by the design studio Takram, based on a sketch by Morioka himself: a rhombus that encapsulates the project’s dual metaphor, representing both an open book and a single room.
