= Konstantine Bagration of Mukhrani (1889–1915) =

Georgian noble (1889–1915)

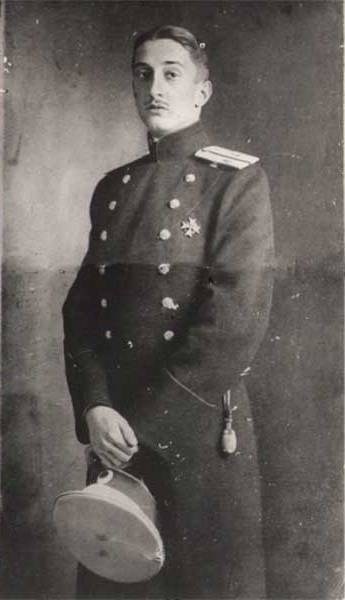
- Prince Konstantine Bagration
- Born: Konstantine Alexandres dze Bagration-Mukhraneli; 14 March 1889; Tbilisi, Georgia, Russian Empire
- Died: 1 June 1915 (aged 26); Zagrody, Galicia, Austria-Hungary
- Burial: Cathedral of the Living Pillar, Mtskheta, Georgia
- Spouse: Princess Tatiana Constantinovna of Russia (m. 1911)
- Issue: Prince Teymuraz Konstantinovich Bagration of Mukhrani; Princess Natalia Konstantinovna Bagration of Mukhrani
- House: Bagration-Mukhraneli
- Father: Alexander Bagration of Mukhrani
- Mother: Nino Tarkhan-Mouravi
- Religion: Georgian Orthodox Church
- Occupation: Soldier

Prince Konstantine Bagration of Mukhrani (Georgian: კონსტანტინე ბაგრატიონ-მუხრანელი; 14 March 1889 – 1 June 1915) was a Georgian nobleman from the House of Mukhrani. A member of the Russian Imperial Guard, Konstantine fought with distinction and died in World War I - actions for which he posthumously received the Order of St. George, the highest military decoration of the Russian Empire. Konstantine was in a brief but controversial marriage with Princess Tatiana Constantinovna of Russia, a member of the Russian Imperial Family.

== Life ==
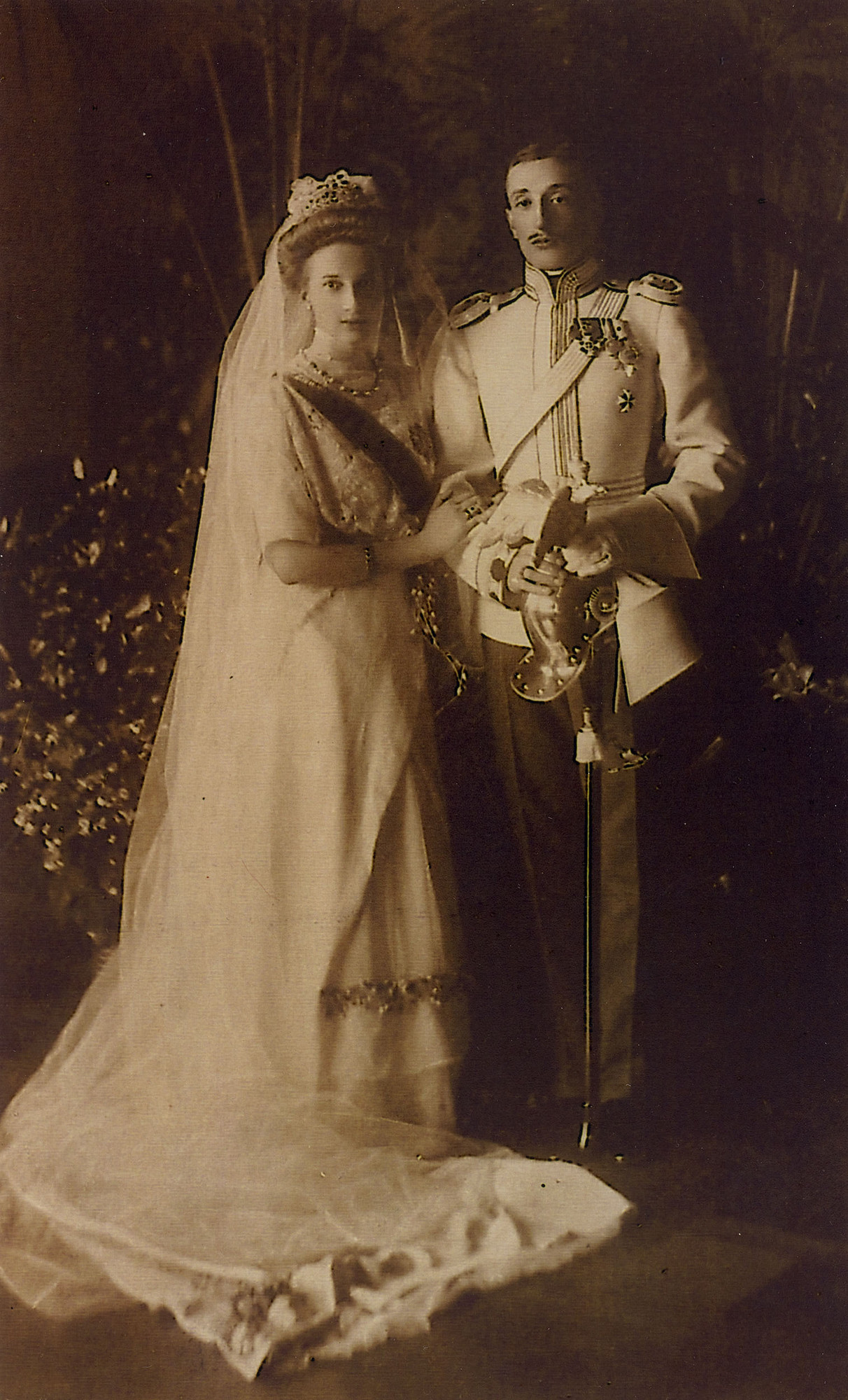
Konstantine and Tatiana at their wedding, 1911.

Konstantine was the son of Prince Alexander Bagration of Mukhrani (1856–1935), a descendant of the Georgian royal House of Bagration, one of the oldest European dynasties.

Alexander was the son of Prince Mikheil (1831-1907), son of Constantine IV, Prince of Mukhrani. Konstantine's mother was Princess Nino Tarkhan-Mouravi (1869–1934), also of Georgian noble blood. He was born in Tbilisi, Georgia, at that time a part of the Russian Empire.

In the winter of 1910, Konstantin made acquaintance of his future wife Tatiana Constantinovna of Russia, from the Russian imperial House of Romanov, during a visit to one of Romanovs' estates.

According to Prince Gabriel Constantinovich of Russia, Tatiana's parents were against her marriage to the Georgian prince, since the Georgian royal house of which he was part had not been a ruling house in some time and was not deemed equal of the Russian Imperial family.

To prevent the marriage, Tatiana's father, Grand Duke Konstantin Konstantinovich of Russia, demanded that Konstantine leave Saint Petersburg, prompting the Georgian nobleman to return to his hometown of Tiflis (Tbilisi, Georgia), and awaiting military deployment to Tehran. As a result of his departure, Konstantine and Tatiana remained apart for an entire year. Their love, however, withstood the time and distance. Due to Tatiana's stubbornness, three Imperial Family Councils were convened on the matter of marriage, with the participation of Emperor Nicholas II of Russia himself. The outcome of these family councils was that the Emperor issued an order, allowing the couple to get married. Konstantine and Tatiana wed in 1911 at the Pavlovsk Palace in the presence of the entire imperial family.

=== World War I and death ===
Several years after his marriage, Konstantine entered World War I as part of the Chevalier Guard Regiment, and in 1915 was awarded the Gold Sword for Bravery due to his heroic actions in the course of combat and reconnaissance missions. Konstantine died in combat later that year and was awarded the Empire's highest military decoration - the Order of St. George. Konstantine's remains were moved to Mtskheta, Georgia's ancient capital, and buried at the Cathedral of the Living Pillar where many other Georgian royalty rest. Along the way, Konstantine's remains were saluted by a line of Russian Imperial troops, soldiers from all local educational establishments and the Cadet Corps.

== Issue ==
Konstantine was survived by Tatiana and their two children:

- Teymuraz Bagration (1912–1992)
- Natasha Bagration (1914–1984)

== See also ==
- Leonida of Mukhrani, Grand Duchess of Russia
