= Princess Tatiana Constantinovna of Russia =

Russian princess (1890–1979)

Princess Tatiana Constantinovna
- Princess Constantine Bagration-Mukhransky of Georgia; Mother Tamara
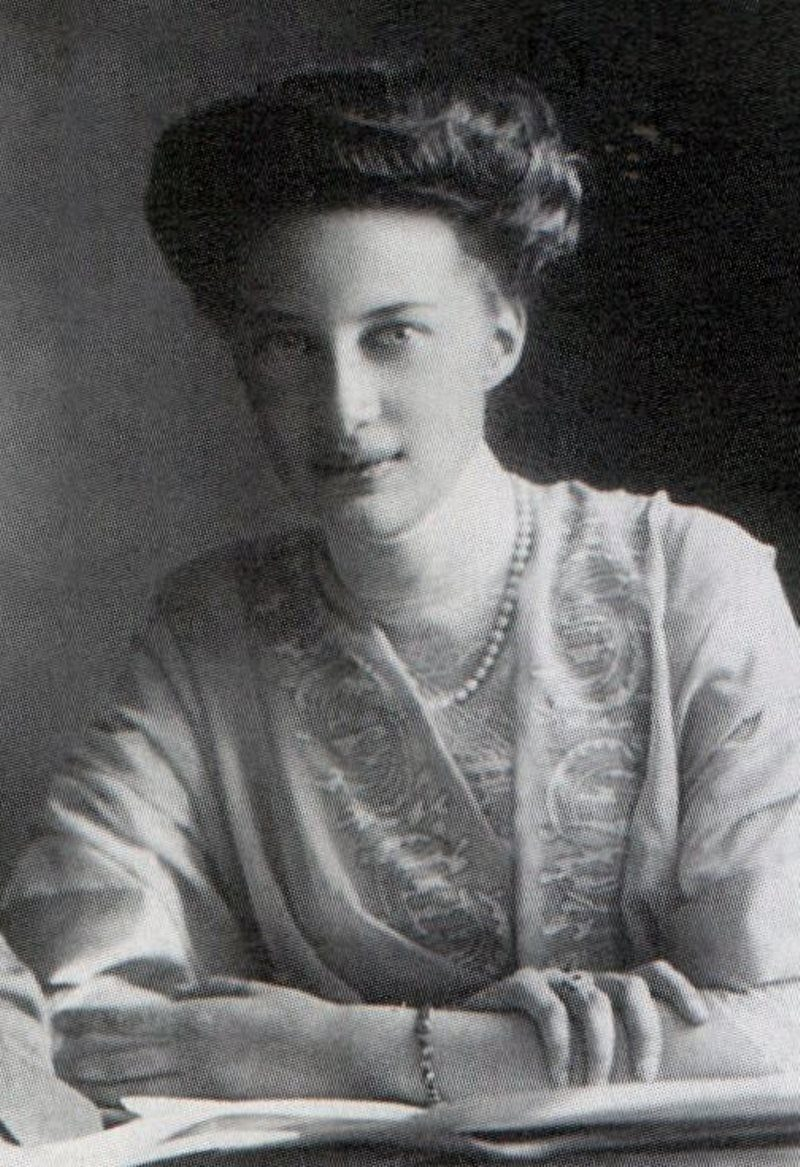
- Tatiana in 1911
- Born: 23 January 1890; Saint Petersburg, Russian Empire
- Died: 28 August 1979 (aged 89); Convent of the Ascension on the Mount of Olives, Jerusalem
- Burial: Mount of Olives, Jerusalem
- Spouse: Prince Constantine Bagration-Mukhransky of Georgia (m. 1911; died 1915) Alexander Vassilievich Korotchenzov (m. 1921; died 1922)
- Issue: Prince Teymuraz Constantinovich Bagration of Mukhrani; Princess Natalia Constantinovna Bagration of Mukhrani
Names
- Tatiana Konstantinovna Romanova
- House: Holstein-Gottorp-Romanov
- Father: Grand Duke Constantine Constantinovich of Russia
- Mother: Princess Elisabeth of Saxe-Altenburg
- Religion: Russian Orthodox

Princess Tatiana Constantinovna of Russia (Russian: Княжна Татьяна Константиовна; 23 January [O.S. 11 January] 1890 – 28 August 1979) was the third child and eldest daughter of Grand Duke Constantine Constantinovich of Russia and his wife, Princess Elisabeth of Saxe-Altenburg. During the Russian Revolution Tatiana Constantinovna fled into exile with her children. She later became a nun and died in Jerusalem in 1979.

== Title ==
On 14 July 1886, Emperor Alexander III of Russia modified the Romanov house laws by restricting the title of Grand Duke/Duchess to children and grandchildren in the male line of a Russian emperor. More distant agnatic descendants would henceforth bear the title of "Prince(ess) of the Blood Imperial". Tatiana, being a great-granddaughter of Nicholas I through his son Konstantin, was only a princess from birth. She was thus entitled to the style of Highness, as opposed to Imperial Highness.

== Early life ==
Tatiana Constantinovna was born on 23 January [O.S. 11 January] 1890. She was the first daughter of Grand Constantine Constantinovich and Grand Duchess Elizabeth Mavrikievna. At the time it was not usual for a member of the Romanov family to have many daughters, so she was gladly accepted. Her name, Tatiana, was the idea of her grandfather, and was taken from the character Tatiana Larina from Alexander Pushkin's novel Eugene Onegin. Tatiana Constantinovna had six brothers and two sisters.

She was close friends with Tsar Nicholas II's two eldest daughters, Olga and Tatiana Nikolaevna, and was mentioned frequently in both their diaries.

As a child Tatiana Constantinovna was a quiet girl, with a talent for the piano, something she got from her father, the Grand Duke Constantine Constantinovich.

Tatiana made her first official court appearance on 24 August [O.S. 11 August] 1904, for the celebration of the christening of her cousin Tsarevich Alexei Nikolaevich, who was to be baptised in the Church at the Palace of Peterhof. It was the first time she appeared in full Russian court dress. Earlier that morning, she left the Constantine Palace, which was nearby, in a string of carriages, which went along the Finnish Gulf before reaching the Emperor's estate. She wore "long white gloves" with "a string of her mother's pearls around her neck, and a satin kokoshnik with a large bow atop her hair."

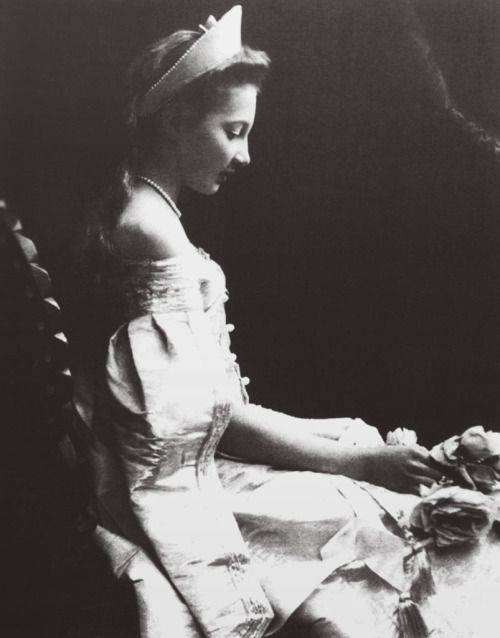
Tatiana Constantinovna in official Russian court dress. Circa August 11th/24th 1904

When she was young she enjoyed the company of animals. Once her brother Gavrill gave her a pink cockatoo, which he had been trying to teach to speak, but to no avail. Tatiana was playing with it when the bird suddenly turned on her, cutting her with its beak across her forehead. Although the cut was harmless, the scar remained the rest of her life.

When she was nineteen years old, in the spring of 1909, Tatiana put on a play with the rest of her siblings in honor of the 25th anniversary of their parents' wedding. It was titled: "The Wedding of Sun and Spring", with Tatiana in the role of Spring. That year she also participated in an activity with her family where they recreated the famous portrait of Emperor Paul I's family.

== Terms of marriage ==
In early 1911, Tatiana was rumored to be marrying Prince Alexander of Serbia (later Alexander I of Yugoslavia), but nothing came of this; Alexander later married Princess Maria of Romania.

In the spring of 1911, Tatiana became engaged to Prince Constantine Bagration of Mukhrani (14 March 1889, Tbilisi, - 1 June 1915, Jarosław), a Georgian by birth who was serving in a Russian Imperial Guards regiment, and died in World War I. She was to be the first daughter of the Romanovs to openly marry a Russian subject or non-dynastic prince since the dynasty ascended the throne in 1613. Legally Tatiana Constantinovna's marriage was morganatic.

Her father did not approve of the match, and initially sent Tatiana away to the Crimea to visit her relative Dowager Empress Maria Feodorovna. It was there that the grand duke found his daughter with Constantine Bagration, and gave his blessing.

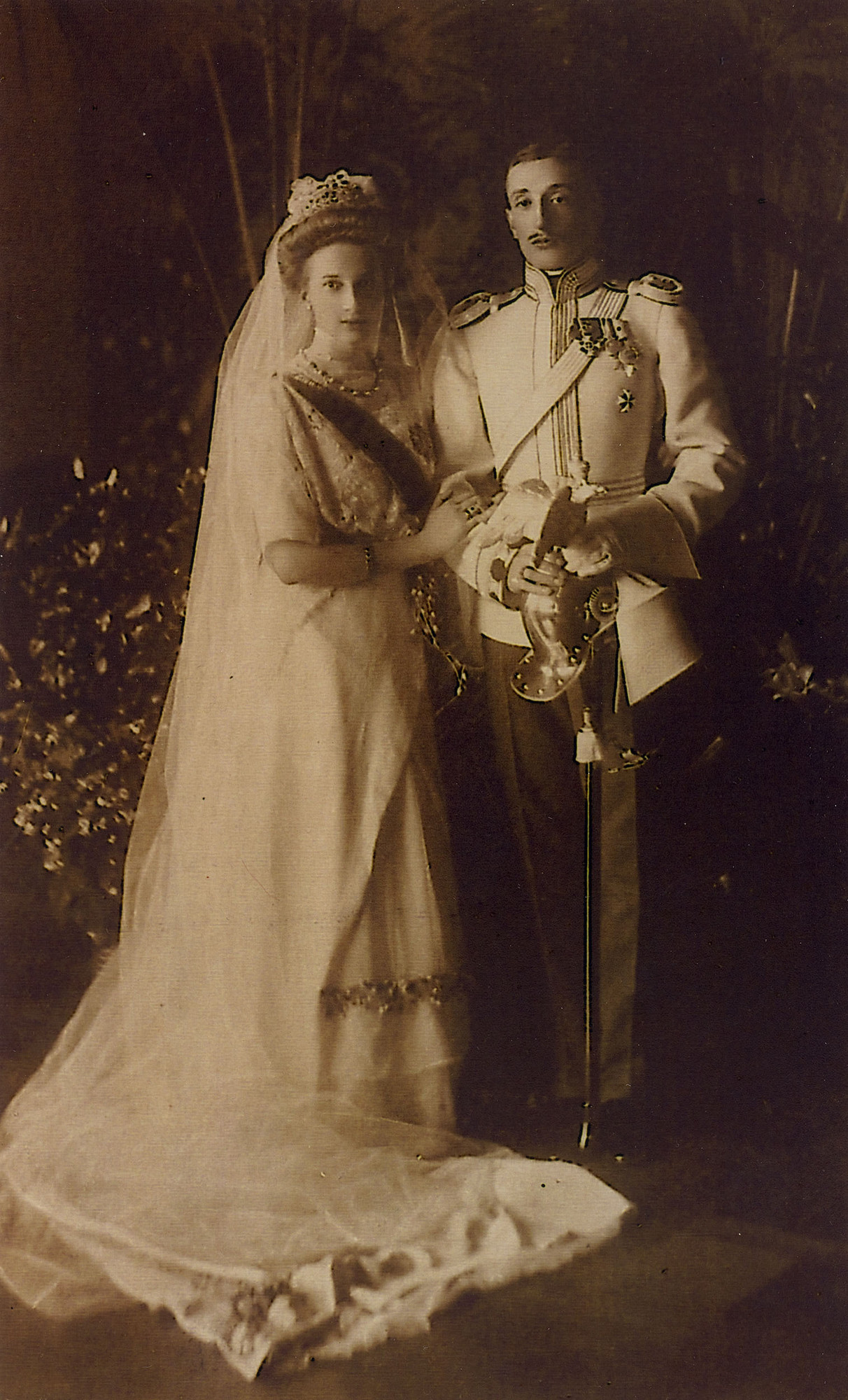
Princess Tatiana Constantinovna and her husband Prince Konstantin Bagration-Mukhransky.

It was, in fact, the first marriage in the dynasty conducted in compliance with the Emperor's formal decision not to accept as dynastic the marriages of even the most junior Romanovs—those that bore only the title of prince/princess—with non-royal partners. According to "Always A Grand Duke", the 1933 memoir of Nicholas II's brother-in-law, Grand Duke Alexander Mikhailovich of Russia (published in New York, by Farrar and Rinehart, Inc.), concern about the eventual marriages of cadet Romanovs so troubled the senior grand dukes that Alexander approached the Emperor about relaxing the requirement that dynasts marry partners "possessing corresponding rank" enshrined in article 188 of the Fundamental Laws (the so-called "Pauline Laws"), but was rebuffed. The grand dukes officially petitioned the Emperor through a commission chaired by Grand Duke Nicholas Nikolayevich of Russia, requesting that a new category of dynastic marriages be recognized, to consist of Imperial princes and princesses entitled, with specific Imperial consent, to marry persons of non-royal blood and to transmit to the issue thereof eligibility to inherit the throne. The Emperor's response was issued formally on 14 June 1911 in the form of a memorandum from the Imperial court minister, Baron Vladimir Frederiks (State Archives of the Russian Federation, Series 601, {"The Emperor Nicholas II"}, Inventory {register} 1, File 2143, pages 58–59):

The Lord Emperor has seen fit to permit marriages to persons not possessing corresponding rank of not all Members of the Imperial Family, but only of Princes and Princesses of the Blood Imperial...Princes as well as Princesses of the Blood Imperial, upon contracting a marriage with a person not possessing corresponding rank, shall personally retain the title and privileges which are theirs by birth, with the exception of their right to succession from which they shall have abdicated before entering the marriage. In relation to the categorization of the marriages of Princes and Princesses of the Blood Imperial, the Lord Emperor has seen fit to recognize only two categories in these marriages: (a) equal marriages, i.e. those contracted with persons belonging to a Royal or Ruling House, and (b) unequal marriages, i.e. those contracted with persons not belonging to a Royal or Ruling House, and will not recognize any other categories.

As promised in this communiqué, the Emperor proceeded to legalize authorized marriages of imperial Romanovs below grand ducal rank to persons who lacked "corresponding rank". Such marriages had been altogether banned, rather than deemed morganatic, by Alexander III's ukase #5868 on 23 March 1889. But ukase #35731/1489, issued on 11 August 1911, amended the 1889 ban with the words, "Henceforth no grand duke or grand duchess may contract a marriage with a person not possessing corresponding rank, that is, not belonging to a Royal or Ruling house."

Both the 1889 and 1911 decrees were addenda to article 188 of the Pauline laws (re-codified as article 63 of the Imperial Family Statute). Left intact, however, was that original statute: "A person of the Imperial family who has entered into a marriage alliance with a person not possessing corresponding rank, that is, not belonging to a Royal or Ruling House, cannot pass on to that person, or to any posterity that may issue from such a marriage, the rights which belong to the Members of the Imperial family."

Also remaining unrepealed was article 36 ("Children born of a marriage between a member of the Imperial Family and a person not of corresponding rank, that is, not belonging to a Royal or Ruling House, shall have no right of succession to the Throne"). Aside from article 188, article 36 applied to prevent Tatiana Constantinovna's issue from claiming succession rights.

Her contemplated marriage having been rendered legal, Tatiana Constantinovna renounced her dynastic rights, as required. Nicholas II acknowledged this in a ukase addressed to the Imperial Senate on 9 February 1914 (Collection of Statutes and Decrees of the Government, 1914, #441): "Her Highness the Princess Tatiana Constantinovna has presented to Us over Her own sign manual, a renunciation of the right to succession to the Imperial Throne of All the Russias belonging to Her as a member of the Imperial House," receiving in return Nicholas II's authorization to marry Bagration-Mukhransky.

Finally, Tatiana Constantinovna and her Georgian prince were married, at her father's estate at Pavlovsk, on 6 September [O.S. 24 August] 1911. The Emperor was present at the wedding and, according to a family tradition subsequently repeated by the bride's son, Nicholas II is reported to have suggested that the bridegroom sign the wedding register as "Prince Gruzinsky", perhaps a courteous acknowledgement of the fact that, although for the preceding century the Bagrations might only rank as nobles who bore the fairly common title of Knyaz (prince) in Russia, historically the Mukhranskys were a branch of a deposed royal dynasty that had ruled on both sides of the Caucasus for hundreds of years longer than the Romanovs. By changing the law, granting unprecedented permission for the marriage, and personally attending it, Nicholas II was not, in fact, treating this marriage as an act of rebellion, nor as a disgrace to the Romanovs. Yet his acceptance was conditioned upon the marriage being deemed legally morganatic, reflecting the non-dynastic status that the Bagration-Mukhranskys held in Russia in 1911.

On the same day, the Emperor issued yet another ukase, (#35766): "By Our and Grand Duke Konstantin Konstantinovich’s and Grand Duchess Elizaveta Mavrikievna’s consent, the wedding took place on 24th day of this August [old style] of the Daughter of Their Imperial Highnesses, Her Highness the Princess Tatiana Konstantinovna, with Prince Konstantin Bagration-Mukhransky. In consequence of this order: The Princess Tatiana Konstantiovna to retain the title of Highness and henceforth to bear the name of Her Highness the Princess Tatiana Konstantinovna Princess Bagration-Mukhransky..."

== Adult life ==
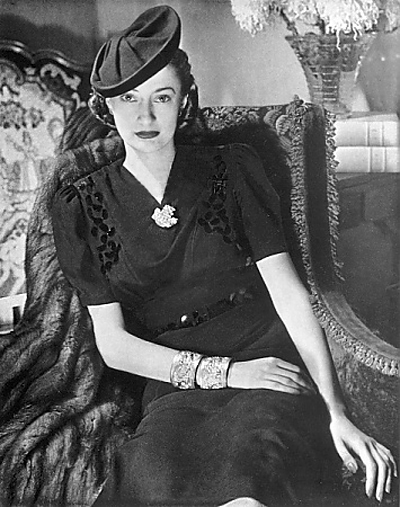
Princess Natalia Bagration-Mukhransky, Lady Johnston, daughter of Tatiana.

During the summer of 1914 Tatiana participated in the ceremonies to welcome the President of France to Russia.

When she was twenty-five years old, Tatiana injured herself driving a charabanc. According to a letter Olga Nikolaevna wrote to her father:

"During the day yesterday Tatiana Konstantinovna was driving the charabanc by herself. She hit something, turned over, and now is in bed with torn ligaments."

Tatiana and Prince Constantine Bagration of Mukhrani had two children:

- Teymuraz Bagration (1912-1992)
- Natasha Bagration (1914-1984)

After the outbreak of World War I, Constantine Bagration enlisted in Russia's armed forces, and was killed in action in 1915. She became close to Elisabeth Feodorovna at the time, and refused to wear black at her husband's funeral. She moved with her brother Igor to the Caucasus after praying on Kostantin's funeral, she received the blessing of her father for the last time as she left. Just two days after the funeral of her husband her father died.

Her brother Oleg was wounded in action, and subsequently died on 29 September 1914 at Vitebsk Hospital in Vilno. Three other brothers, John, Constantine and Igor, were murdered by Bolsheviks in 1918.

Tatiana Constantinovna is reported to have become especially close to her uncle, Grand Duke Dmitri Constantinovich during her widowhood. After the February Revolution, she stayed with him in his palace, where she fell in love with his aide-de-camp, Alexander Vassilievich Korochenzov (29 August 1878 – 6 February 1922). Urged by her uncle, after they were ordered back to Petersburg from previous exile, she left Russia with Korochenzov and her young children. They were fortunate enough to escape, as Dmitri Constantinovich was executed in St. Petersburg in January 1919.

Tatiana Constantinovna and Korochenzov at first fled to Romania and later to Switzerland.

Tatiana reunited with her mother and sister, Vera Constantinovna, and brother, George Constantinovich, along with her children, in Brussels in 1921. In November 1921, she married Korochenzov in Geneva. Not quite three months later, however, Tatiana became a widow for the second time when Alexander died in Lausanne. Tatiana raised her children alone, giving them the best education she possibly could, and, after both were grown and married, she took the veil, in Switzerland in 1946, just after the end of the second World War, which was her father's dream. Whenever going to Geneva she stayed at the house of Constantine Bargration's niece, Tatiana. At first she served at St. Mary Magdalene Convent in Jerusalem, coincidentally where relics of Elisabeth Feodorovna were moved. She later served as Abbess at the Mount of Olives Convent in Jerusalem, and died as Mother Tamara (named so after the medieval Georgian queen Tamar, a remote ancestor of Tatiana's first husband), on 28 August 1979.

== Marriage's Implications for Succession Claims ==
In post-monarchy debates over which pretender has the strongest claim to Russia's throne under the dynastic laws, the marriage of Tatiana Constantinovna is often cited in support of rival claimants. Some cite it as evidence that marriage to a member of the Bagration family cannot be considered any more "equal" than marriage to any other prince of Russia's nobility, since the marriage was morganatic and she was only able to obtain the Emperor's approval by first renouncing her succession rights. According to this argument, Maria Vladimirovna Romanov and her son, George Mikhailovich, cannot be rightful claimants to the throne because Maria Vladimirovna's mother is Princess Leonida Bagration-Mukhransky, belonging to the same family previously banned from marriage with the Romanovs on equal terms. An oft-heard rebuttal is that the Bagrations fall into the same "grey area" as the 1856 marriage of Grand Duchess Maria Nikolayevna to Duke Maximilian of Leuchtenberg, who was not a member of a "royal or ruling family", despite his historical dynastic connections, yet Emperor Nicholas I exercised Imperial authority to rule in favor of Duke Maximilien's dynasticity for marital purposes.

Other monarchists argue that the circumstances of Tatiana Constantinovna's marriage confirm Maria Vladimirovna's claim on two counts. First, they maintain that Nicholas II's acceptance of Tatiana Constantinovna's renunciation prior to marriage explicitly confirms that she had succession rights despite being born of a Lutheran mother who never converted to the Russian Orthodox Church, which is a prerequisite for successors to Russia's throne. A rebuttal is that article 185 of the Pauline laws is explicit: "The marriage of a male member of the Imperial House who might succeed to the Throne to a person of another faith may not take place until she embraces Orthodoxy."

The second relevant claim in support of Maria Vladimirovna is that Tatiana Constantinovna's mandated renunciation proves that Romanov princes were required to marry "equally" in order to transmit succession rights to their descendants, an interpretation denied by Nicholas Romanovich Romanoff, former president of the Romanoff Family Association, in an interview with the royalty magazine, Point de Vue, published 14 February 1991, who stated, "Let’s take the example of the Princess Tatiana who, in 1911, married a prince of a very great family of Georgia, but which was not reigning. Before giving his authorization, Czar Nicholas requested that the princess renounce her rights of succession in advance. That argument is very important since, although her mother was Lutheran, the princess only renounced upon her marriage, whereas there was a law stating that children born of a non-Orthodox marriage had no right to succeed as czar. Nonetheless, Nicholas II requested her renunciation."

The counter-claim has been that the wording of the August 1911 ukase restricting the ban on morganatic marriages to grand dukes was silent on imperial princes, therefore the Frederiks memorandum was not given full legal effect.

== Archives ==
Tatiana Constantinovna's personal papers (including correspondence, writings and photographs) are preserved in the "Romanov Family Papers" collection in the Hoover Institution Archives (Stanford, California, US). This collection includes Tatiana Constantinovna's correspondence with several different persons, such as her mother, her siblings, other royals and friends.

== Ancestry ==
Ancestors of Princess Tatiana Constantinovna of Russia

8. Nicholas I of Russia
4. Grand Duke Constantine Nikolaevich of Russia
9. Princess Charlotte of Prussia
2. Grand Duke Constantine Constantinovich of Russia
10. Joseph, Duke of Saxe-Altenburg
5. Princess Alexandra of Saxe-Altenburg
11. Duchess Amelia of Württemberg
1. Princess Tatiana Constantinovna of Russia
12. George, Duke of Saxe-Altenburg
6. Prince Moritz of Saxe-Altenburg
13. Duchess Marie Louise of Mecklenburg-Schwerin
3. Princess Elisabeth of Saxe-Altenburg
14. Bernhard II, Duke of Saxe-Meiningen
7. Princess Augusta of Saxe-Meiningen
15. Princess Marie Frederica of Hesse-Kassel
