= Teymuraz Bagration =

Georgian prince (1912–1992)

Prince Teymuraz Constantinovich
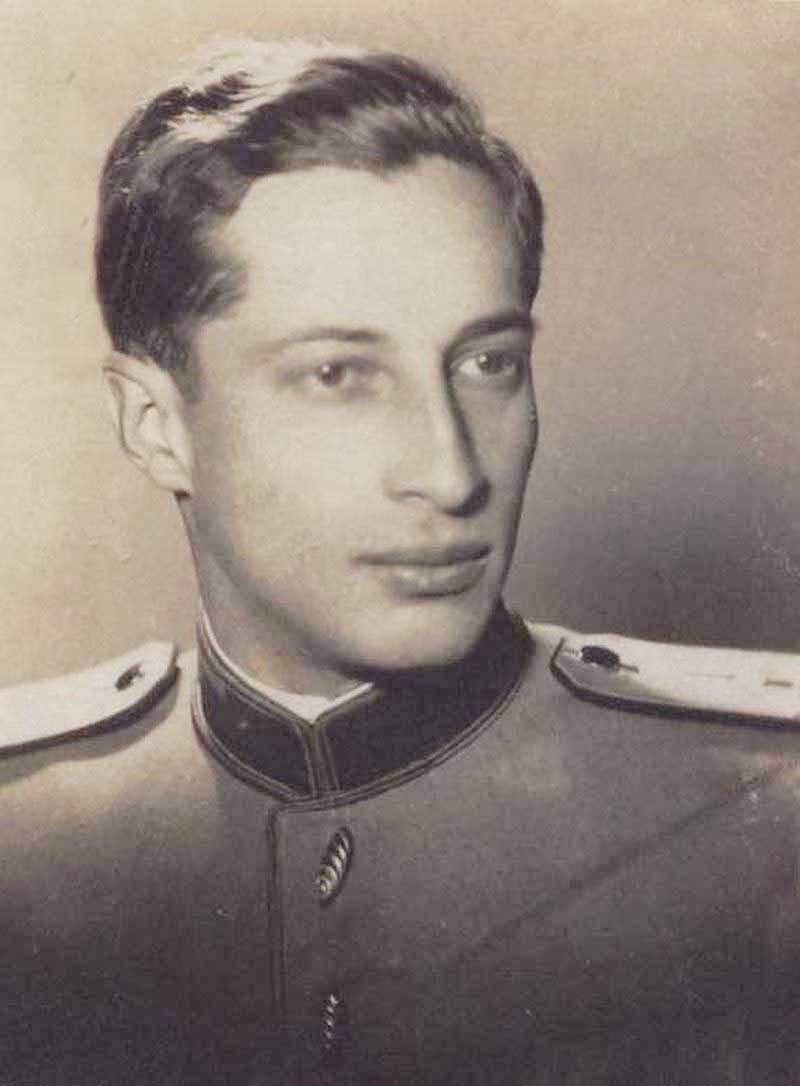
- Prince Teymuraz Constantinovich as member of Royal Yugoslavian Guard
- Born: 21 August 1912; Pavlovsk, Russian Empire
- Died: 10 April 1992 (aged 79); New York, U.S.
- Spouse: Katarina Račić (m. 1940; died 1946) Irina Czernysheva-Besobrasova (m. 1949)
- House: Bagration-Mukhraneli
- Father: Prince Konstantine Bagration of Mukhrani
- Mother: Princess Tatiana Constantinovna of Russia
- Military career
- Allegiance: Kingdom of Yugoslavia
- Branch: Army
- Service years: 1935–1941
- Rank: Lieutenant
- Unit: Royal Guard

Prince Teymuraz Bagration of Mukhrani (21 August 1912 – 10 April 1992) was a Georgian-Russian nobleman and an émigré first to Kingdom of Yugoslavia and later in the United States. He served as President of the Tolstoy Foundation, a New York-based charitable organization.

== Life ==
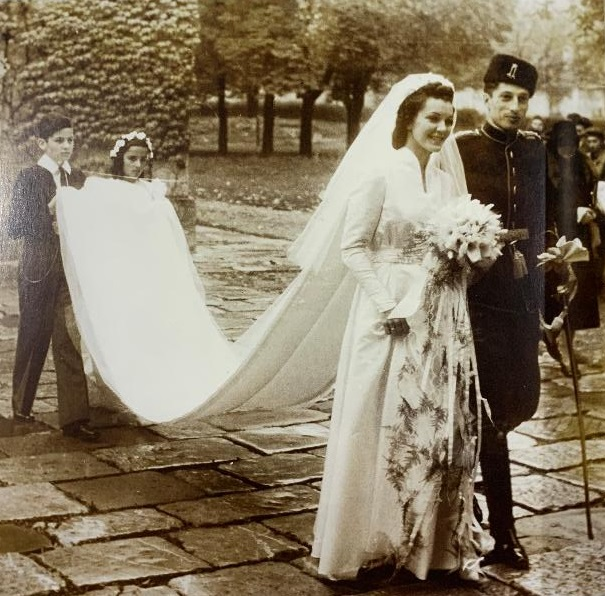
Wedding of Prince Teimuraz Bagration to Katarina Račić, the grand-daughter of Nikola Pašić, former Serbian Prime Minister, held in Topčider Church, Belgrade, Yugoslavia, 1940

He was born at Pavlovsk, Imperial Russia, into a formerly sovereign family. His father, Prince Konstantin Bagration-Mukhransky (1889–1915), was a member of the Mukhrani branch of the Bagrationi dynasty, the former ruling family of the Kingdom of Georgia, who served as an officer in the Imperial Russian Army and was killed in World War I. Teymuraz's mother, Princess Tatiana Constantinovna of Russia (1890–1979) was a member of the Romanov dynasty, that ruled the Empire of Russia. Through her, he was second cousin of both Prince Philip, Duke of Edinburgh and Princess Marina, Duchess of Kent.

Teymuraz Bagration left Russia after the 1917 Revolution, first living in Switzerland and then settling in the Kingdom of Yugoslavia. His uncle Prince John of Russia was married to Princess Helen, elder sister of King Alexander I of Yugoslavia. Prince Bagration graduated in 1932 from the Krymskiy Cadet School and then studied at the Yugoslav Military Academy. He served for ten years in the Guards Mounted Artillery Regiment of the Royal Yugoslav Army. During World War II, he served in the Royal Yugoslav Army. After the war, he emigrated to the U.S. and was invited to join the Tolstoy Foundation in 1949. He became Executive Director of the Foundation in 1979 and led the organization from 1986 until his death in New York in 1992.

On 5 July 2007, Bagration's unique archive was presented by his second wife, Princess Irina, to the National Parliamentary Library of Georgia.

== Personal life ==
Bagration was married twice. The first time he was married in Belgrade to Katarina Račić (4 Jul 1919, London - 20 December 1946), the granddaughter of the Serbian Prime minister Nikola Pašić on 27 October 1940. At the time of the wedding, he was 28 and she was 21, but the marriage ended with Katarina's death at the age of 27.

The second marriage was with Countess Irina Czernysheva-Besobrasova (26 September 1926, Neuilly-sur-Seine - 9 July 2015, New York City), the daughter of Count Sergei Aleksandrovich Czernyshev-Besobrasov and Countess Elizaveta Sheremeteva. Irina was the older sister of Countess Xenia Czernyshev-Besobrasov, who married in 1953 Archduke Rudolf Syringus, youngest son of Karl I of Austria, the last Austrian Emperor. This marriage was celebrated on 27 November 1949 and took place in New York City. He was 37 and she was 23. There was no issue of either marriage.

== Ancestry ==
Ancestors of Teymuraz Bagration

8. Prince Mikheil Bagration of Mukhrani
4. Prince Alexander Bagration of Mukhrani
9. Elizaveta Alexandrovna Ivinskaya
2. Prince Konstantine Bagration of Mukhrani
10. Prince Joseph Tarkhan-Mouravi
5. Princess Nino Tarkhan-Mouravi
11. Princess Barbara Jambakur-Orbeliani
1. Prince Teymuraz Bagration of Mukhrani
12. Grand Duke Konstantin Nikolayevich of Russia
6. Grand Duke Konstantin Konstantinovich of Russia
13. Princess Alexandra of Saxe-Altenburg
3. Princess Tatiana Constantinovna of Russia
14. Prince Moritz of Saxe-Altenburg
7. Princess Elisabeth of Saxe-Altenburg
15. Princess Augusta of Saxe-Meiningen
