= Cody's Books =

Bookstore based in Berkeley, California, US

Coordinates: 37.8658°N 122.2589°W

- Cody's Telegraph Avenue store held their closing sale July 4 – July 10, 2006
- Type: Private subsidiary
- Founded: Berkeley, California (1956)
- Founder: Fred Cody & Pat Cody
- Headquarters: Berkeley, California, U.S.
- Key people: Fred Cody (Founder); Pat Cody (CEO); Andy Ross (Former President); Hiroshi Kagawa(President)
- Products: Books; magazines
- Owner: IBC Publishing Group

Cody's Books (1956–2008) was an independent bookstore based in Berkeley, California. It "was a pioneer in bookselling, bringing the paperback revolution to Berkeley, fighting censorship, and providing a safe harbor from tear gas directed at anti-Vietnam War protesters throughout the 1960s and 1970s."

== History ==
The restrooms at the Telegraph Avenue store, equipped with blackboards and chalk

The first store opened in 1956 on Euclid Avenue in Berkeley, California. It was founded by Fred (1916–1983) and Pat (1923–2010) Cody. It moved to a larger location on Telegraph Avenue in 1960. As the business expanded, it outgrew this property too. In 1962, Steve Van Strum joined the staff and built up the French and German book sales. In 1964, Van Strum's investment counsellor father put in a bid for an old gas station on a corner lot nearby. The bid was successful and the father gave the Codys and his son a free hand to design a building fit for a good bookshop, one with high ceilings, plenty of light and soft wood and textiles to surround the books. Steve Van Strum created a poetry festival in the Spring of 1965 with an unusually large collection of 1,000 poetry titles on exhibit and on sale and poets reading on site. The bookshop moved to the new building in 1965, it becoming the largest store dedicated to paperbacks in the area. Van Strum was key to the growing international connections of the book store, attending the Frankfurt Book Fair and liaising with Oxford University Press. He left, with his wife Carol Van Strum and children, in 1968 after which the Codys once again had the total responsibility of managing the store.

In 1968, "Cody's served as a first-aid station […] when anti-war protesters were tear gassed and clubbed just outside its Telegraph Avenue doors […] the store's employees were tending the wounded – anti-war protesters teargassed and clubbed by the police and the National Guard as protests broke out on Telegraph Avenue." In the early 1970s, Mario Savio worked as a clerk at the Telegraph Avenue store.

In 1977, the Codys sold the store to Andy Ross, who owned it until 2006.

Cody's was best known for its extensive selection of poetry, literary, political, and scholarly titles.

On February 28, 1989, unknown persons threw a firebomb through the window of the store. It was thought that this was in response to the prominent display of Salman Rushdie's The Satanic Verses, which had been banned by a fatwa by Iranian clerics one month prior. An undetonated pipe bomb was subsequently discovered in the store. In response the staff unanimously voted to keep the book on display despite the attack and the increasing willingness of chain bookstores to bow to pressure to withdraw it.

Cody's pioneered a well-regarded author-reading series. Some prominent authors and notables who appeared at Cody's were: Tom Robbins, Norman Mailer, Ken Kesey, Alice Walker, Allen Ginsberg, Maurice Sendak, Bill Clinton, Jimmy Carter, Muhammad Ali, and Salman Rushdie.

In the 1980s, Cody's was a plaintiff in several anti-trust lawsuits charging that independent book sellers were discriminated against in favor of chain stores. Cody's owner, Andy Ross, was a prominent spokesperson supporting independent businesses against chain stores and Internet retailers.

== Neighborhood booksellers ==
Cody's was a core bookseller among a coterie of independent booksellers, which included Moe's Books (located nearly next door to Cody's), Pendragon/Pellucidar/Pegasus, Shakespeare & Co., Black Oak Books, Diesel, and others, all located in the region from North Berkeley to North Oakland. This region includes the University of California, Berkeley. Together they were members of a significant regional supporter of independent bookselling, The Northern California Independent Bookseller's Association, or NCIBA.

== Moves and closure ==
The Telegraph store was the flagship store until it closed in 2006, sparking a controversy in the local press over the cause. One explanation given for the closure was that it was caused by pressure from corporate chains like Borders. The location remained vacant until 2016, when "Mad Monk, Center for Anachronistic Media" was opened, and operated for two years.

The Cody's San Francisco location closed in 2007 for a similar reason. Cody's was sold to Japanese book distributor Yohan, Inc. in September 2006.

In March 2008, the last remaining store moved from 4th Street to its final location on Shattuck Avenue due to a rent increase. Financial pressures forced the closure of the store for good on June 20, 2008.

The 2008 PBS TV documentary Paperback Dreams chronicles the related histories of Kepler's Books in Menlo Park, California and Cody's Books.

=== Timeline ===
Stores:

- Euclid Avenue, Berkeley, 1956–1960
- Telegraph Avenue and Dwight, Berkeley, 1960–1965
- 2454 Telegraph Avenue at Haste Street, Berkeley, 1965 – July 10, 2006
- 2 Stockton Street, San Francisco, 2005–2007
- 1730 4th St., Berkeley 1997–March 2008
- 2201 Shattuck Ave., Downtown Berkeley April 1, 2008 – June 19, 2008 then a final sale starting from August 14–August 22 or August 23, 2008

== See also ==
- Kepler's Books
- Printers Inc. Bookstore
