= Lewis H. Michaux =

American activist

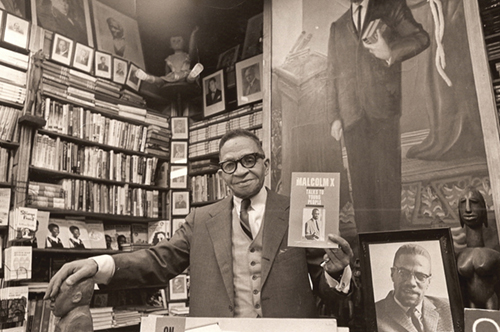
- Born: 1885 or 1895; Newport News, Virginia, U.S.
- Died: August 25, 1976 (aged 92 or 82)
- Occupation: Bookseller
- Known for: African National Memorial Bookstore
- Relatives: Lightfoot Solomon Michaux (brother)

Lewis H. Michaux (1885/1895 – 1976) was a bookseller and civil rights activist in the Harlem neighborhood in New York City. Between 1932 and 1974 he owned the African National Memorial Bookstore, one of the most prominent African-American bookstores in the country.

== Early life ==
Michaux was born in Newport News, Virginia, 1895 — although his birth year and day is uncertain; according to The New York Times he was born August 4, 1885. He was the son of Henry Michaux and Blanche Pollard. Michaux had little formal education.

== Career ==
Before coming to New York he worked as a pea picker, window washer and deacon in the Philadelphia church of his brother, Lightfoot Solomon.

== African National Memorial Bookstore ==
The bookstore was founded by Michaux in 1932 on 7th Avenue and stayed there until 1968, when Michaux was forced to move the store to West 125th Street (on the corner of 7th avenue) to give space to the State Harlem office building. The bookstore finally closed in 1974 after another row with authorities over its location.

Michaux stimulated a generation of students, intellectuals, writers and artists. He called his bookstore "House of Common Sense and the Home of Proper Propaganda". The store became an important reading room of the Civil Rights Movement. While Izzy Young's Folk Center further south in Greenwich Village became a hang-out during the folk revival of the late 1950s and early 1960s, including the rising Bob Dylan, the Memorial Bookstore up in Harlem was a rare place for black people and scholars and anyone interested in literature by, or about, African Americans, Africans, Caribbeans and South Americans. In the early 1960s folk and popular music, and the civil rights movement, were inter-related, overlapping and "inspiring the growth and creativity of each other" as historians Izzerman and Kazin write Michaux's bookstore had over 200,000 texts and was the nation's largest on its subject. Everyone, white and black, was encouraged to begin home libraries and those who were short of money were allowed to sit down and read.

== Politics and religion ==
Michaux was active in the Black nationalism movement from the 1930s to the 1960s and supported Marcus Garvey's Pan-Africanism. Harlem had been the headquarters of Garvey's Universal Negro Improvement Association and African Communities League of the world—the largest mass black movement of the times.

Alagba (Elder) Michaux was a personal friend of Malcolm X and a member of the Organization of Afro-American Unity that was formed in 1964.

When it came to religion, Michaux had a sign in the store reading "Christ is Black", but he also departed from his brother Lightfoot Solomon's affiliations with Christianity, saying: "The only lord I know, is the landlord."

== Personal life ==
Michaux was married to Bettie Kennedy Logan and they had one son. His brother, Solomon Lightfoot Michaux, acted as an advisor for U.S. President Harry S. Truman and helped to build a 500+ unit housing development for the poor.

== Death ==
Michaux died of cancer at Calvary Hospital in the Bronx, New York. He was reportedly 92 at the time of his death.
