= Kepler's Books =

Independent bookstore in Menlo Park, California

Coordinates: 37.4535°N 122.1820°W

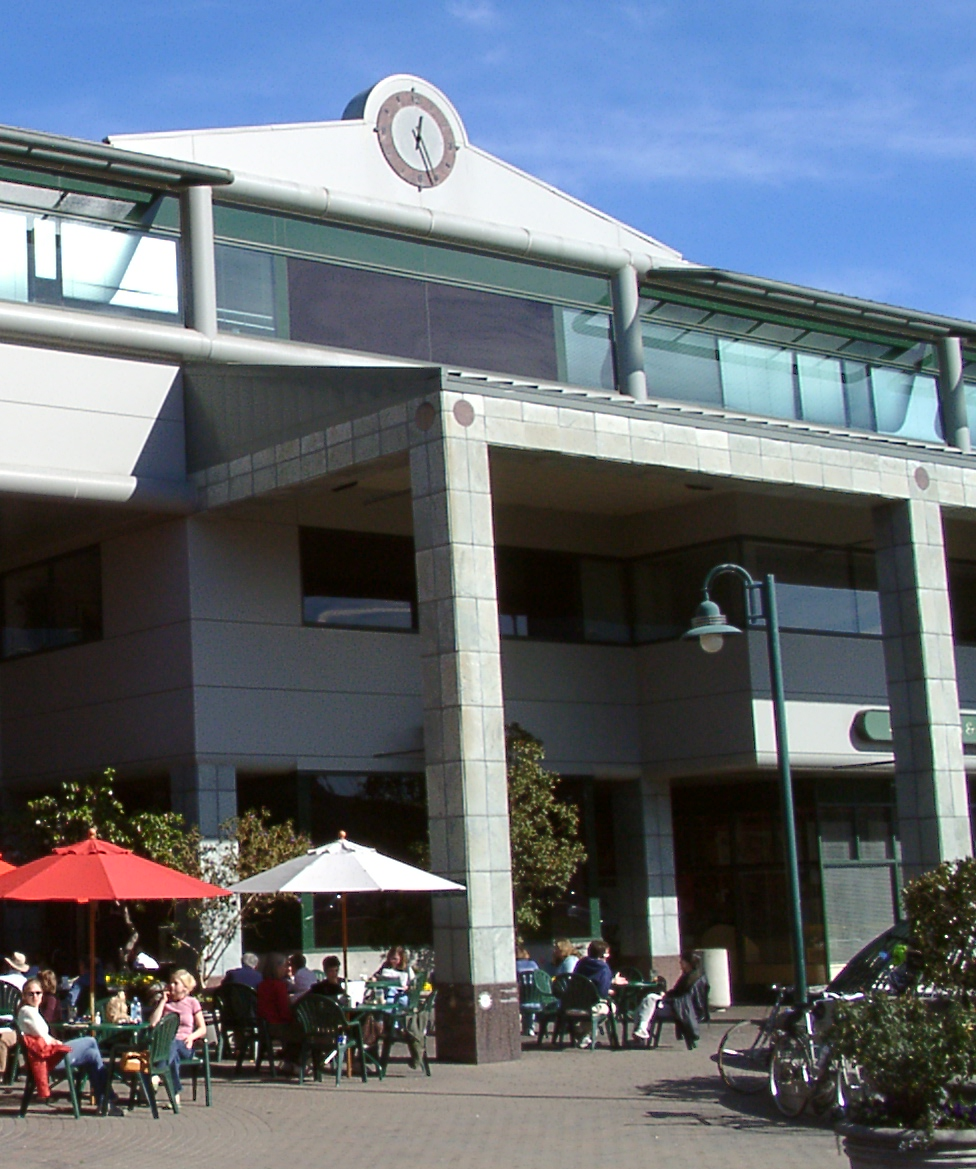
- Kepler's Books (right)
- Type: Hybrid: nonprofit and social purpose corporation
- Founded: Menlo Park, California (May 25, 1955)
- Founder: Roy Kepler & Patricia Kepler
- Headquarters: Menlo Park, California, U.S.
- Key people: Roy Kepler (founder); Ira Sandperl; Clark Kepler
- Products: Books, magazines
- Website: keplers.com

Kepler's Books and Magazines is an independent bookstore in Menlo Park, California. It was founded on May 14, 1955, by Roy Kepler, a peace activist who had endured multiple internments as a conscientious objector during World War II. Kepler previously had worked as a staff member of radio station KPFA, listener-supported and based in Berkeley. The bookstore "soon blossomed into a cultural epicenter and attracted loyal customers from the students and faculty of Stanford University and from other members of the surrounding communities who were interested in serious books and ideas."

== Beginnings ==
On May 14, 1955, Kepler's Books & Magazines opened next to the Guild Theater in Menlo Park, California.

From the beginning, Kepler's Books was an activist enterprise in consciousness-raising through book-selling, like Ferlinghetti's City Lights Bookstore in San Francisco, or Cody's Books in Berkeley. Through their bookstore Roy Kepler and Ira Sandperl mentored the most prominent young activists of the anti-Vietnam-war movement in the 1960's.

The 1969 April Third Movement was a student organization of a nine-day sit-in to occupy the classified (secret) military Applied Electronics Laboratory (AEL), formerly part of Stanford Research Institute.

== Sixties counterculture ==
John Markoff in his 2005 text, What the Dormouse Said: How the Sixties Counterculture Shaped the Personal Computer Industry, referred to Kepler's as an important meeting place for the Counterculture of the 1960s. The Palo Alto Weekly noted that, "through the 60s and 70s, the culture of Kepler's began to evolve into a broader counter-culture. Beat intellectuals and pacifists were joined by 'people who worked for Whole Earth, hippies into the rock and roll and recreational drug scene, politicos, and people with an interest in ethnic groups'." The Grateful Dead gave live shows there and "folk singer Joan Baez, members of the Grateful Dead, and many local leaders remember sharing ideas, political action, music, and danger in the cramped store."

According to Scott W. Allen's Aces Back to Back (1992), the roots of the Grateful Dead's musical family tree were sown at Kepler's Books in 1960. That year, the Hunter/ Garcia folk duo played there and at universities and colleges all over the Bay Area. "From this point on," says Jerry Garcia, "I kept going farther into music and [Robert] Hunter into writing."

== Roy Kepler's activist bookstore ==
In Radical Chapters: Pacifist Bookseller Roy Kepler and the Paperback Revolution author Michael Doyle documents the bookstore's origins and culture as an expression of Roy Kepler’s life and times, from World War II as a radical pacifist, antinuclear activist during the Cold War, and antiwar activist from the Vietnam War to his death in 1994. Kepler's partner in this project and man-behind-the-counter-who-knew-all-about-books was Ira Sandperl, an anti-war and civil-rights advocate who was a student and teacher of Gandhi's method of nonviolence.

== Recent history ==
In 1980, Roy Kepler's son, Clark, took over management of the bookstore. The store had three different locations in Menlo Park, moving in 1989 to its current location in the Menlo Center on El Camino Real. In 1994 Publishers Weekly ranked Kepler's as "Bookseller of the Year."

The rise of chain bookstores and online shopping created unbeatable competition, rising prices in Menlo Park resulted in Kepler's closing its doors on August 31, 2005. The local community held demonstrations to protest the closing. Kepler's subsequently re-opened in October 2005, financed by community investments, volunteers and donations.

In 2008, the store's children's department won the Pannell Award for excellence. The 2008 documentary Paperback Dreams chronicles the related histories of independent bookstores Kepler's and the now defunct Cody's Books in Berkeley, California.

In 2012, Clark Kepler and Praveen Madan, of San Francisco's The Booksmith, put together the Kepler's "Transition Team," a group of volunteer local business and community leaders. It launched “Kepler’s 2020,” an initiative seeking to transform the independent bookstore into a next-generation community literary and cultural center. The project aims to "create a hybrid business model that includes a for-profit, community-owned-and-operated bookstore, and a nonprofit organization that will feature on-stage author interviews, lectures by leading intellectuals, educational workshops and other literary and cultural events," according to Kepler's press release. Under the Kepler's 2020 program Kepler's was split into two legal entities – a for-profit business with a social mission and a community sponsored nonprofit – with the complementary goals of fostering a culture of books, ideas and "intellectual discourse and civic engagement in the community," according to Kepler's press release.

Since 2012, Kepler's successful turnaround and reinvention have continued to receive wide coverage in national and international press because of the public's interest in finding sustainable models to keep bookstores thriving.

In October 2021, Kepler's collaborated with several other bookstores to launch Reimagining Bookstores, a movement aimed at transforming the role of independent bookstores in communities across the United States. The initiative seeks to reimagine bookstores as next-generation community hubs that promote literacy, foster social connections, and provide sustainable livelihoods for bookstore workers.

== See also ==
- Cody's Books
- Printers Inc. Bookstore
- City Lights Bookstore

== References and further reading ==
- Markoff, John (2005), What the Dormouse Said: How the Sixties Counterculture Shaped the Personal Computer Industry, New York: Penguin
- Doyle, Michael (2012), Radical Chapters: Pacifist Bookseller Roy Kepler and the Paperback Revolution, Syracuse University Press
- Markoff, John (3 May 2024). "In Remembrance: Ira Sandperl". April Third Reunion. Stanford area: April Third Movement.
- Swenson, Lee (2018-03-09). "A Tribute to Ira Sandperl on his Birthday". The Boys Who Said NO! Film.
