= List of online booksellers =

A list of booksellers who predominantly sell new or used books online, although some may sell other items as well; some may also sell through brick and mortar stores. Incorporated is a list of online marketplaces to which numerous small independent booksellers belong.

Name	Headquarters	Type	Description
AALBC.com	United States	Online only	Launched in 1998, focuses on books written by, or about, people of African descent.
AbeBooks	Canada	Online only	Online marketplace for used books, owned by Amazon.com since 2008.
Adlibris	Sweden	Online only	Large Swedish online bookseller.
Adrian Harrington Rare Books	United Kingdom	Retail and online	Rare and antiquarian books, based in the United Kingdom.
Alibris	United States	Online only	An online marketplace for used but also new books
Amazon	United States	Online only	The "world's largest bookstore" began by selling books from its website in 1995, and is now the world's largest online retailer of consumer goods. It operates country-specific versions of its website for Australia, Brazil, Canada, China, France, Germany, India, Italy, Japan, Mexico, the Netherlands, Spain, Sweden, the United Arab Emirates, and the United Kingdom. It bought Bibliofind.com (Cambridge, Massachusetts) in 1999 and AbeBooks in 2008.
Angus & Robertson	Australia	Online only	An Australian bookstore founded in 1884.
Barnes & Noble	United States	Retail and online	The largest retail bookstore chain in the United States, operating more than 600 brick and mortar stores throughout the 50 states. It began experimenting with selling books online as early as the late 1980s.
Better World Books	United States	Online only	Based in the United States, selling used books, and also supporting literacy projects and the Internet Archive.
Biblio.com	United States	Online only	An online marketplace catering to the book collector.
Blackwell's	United Kingdom	Retail and online	A UK bookseller with both online and brick and mortar stores.
Books-A-Million	United States	Retail and online	The second largest bookstore chain in the United States.
BookFinder.com	United States	Online only	A meta-search site (online marketplace) for books, acquired by AbeBooks in 2005, which in turn was acquired by Amazon.com in 2008.
Bookshop.org	United States	Online only	An online book marketplace founded in January 2020. Its stated mission is "to financially support local, independent bookstores."
Booktopia	Australia	Online only	Australia's largest online bookstore. They have 128,000 in stock titles with 800,000 units ready to ship from their 100,000 sq ft distribution centre.
Brotherhood Books	Australia	Online only	An Australian online bookstore.
Chapters	Canada	Retail and online	Owned by Indigo after a takeover in 2001, Chapters is Canada's largest online and retail bookstore.
Chegg.com	United States	Online only	An online bookstore which rents and sells books in United States.
Clarke's Bookshop	South Africa	Retail and online	Independent bookstore known for selling new, used and rare books focused on Africa, specifically Southern Africa.
Dymocks	Australia	Retail and online	The online presence of the Dymocks chain, established in Australia in 1879.
eBay	United States	Online only	Online seller known for selling used books.
Half Price Books	United States	Retail and online	Chain of new and used bookstores in the United States that also sells online.
Jarir Bookstore	Saudi Arabia	Retail and online	
Maremagnum	Italy	Online only	An Italian meta-search site offering over 10 million titles.
Matrubharti	India	Online only	An India-based publisher and portal for free self-published eBooks in English and Indian regional languages.
Momox	Germany	Online only	Berlin-based recommerce site for used books (Medimops) and media. Momox is also selling via eBay and Amazon.
Powell's Books	United States	Retail and online	A chain of brick and mortar stores that also sells online, based out of Portland, Oregon.
Rahva Raamat	Estonia	Retail and online	The largest book retail and wholesale trade company in Estonia, which has a history of over hundred years.
Rare Book Hub	United States	Online only	San Francisco based bookseller of rare and antique books.
Rokomari	Bangladesh	Online only	Online bookstore from Bangladesh
The Second Shelf	United Kingdom	Online only	London-based bookshop founded in 2018 focusing on rare Women's literature.
ThriftBooks	United States	Online only	Web-based used bookseller headquartered near Seattle, Washington.
Waterstones	United Kingdom	Retail and online	A UK bookseller with both online and brick and mortar stores.
World of Books	United Kingdom	Online only	Based in the United Kingdom, selling used books

Defunct online booksellers

Name	Headquarters	Type	Description	Defunct as of
Book Depository	United Kingdom	Online only	founded 2004, bought by Amazon.com 2011, offered free shipping for books to addresses worldwide	Closed in April 2023
Book People	United Kingdom	Retail and online	was a discount bookseller based in Godalming, Surrey, United Kingdom. It also sold in workplaces and schools via a nationwide network of Book People Local distributors. (Bankrupt)	
Borders Books and Music	United States	Retail and online	a chain of brick and mortar stores that began selling books online relatively late, in 2008, after ending a marketing alliance with Amazon	Defunct as of 2011
Half.com	United States	Online only	is an online bookstore which sells second hand or used books in United States	Defunct as of 10/31/17.

== See also ==
- List of independent bookstores
- List of bookstore chains
