= Better World Books =

Online used book seller

- Type: Private; B Corporation
- Industry: Online bookseller
- Founded: 2002
- Founder: Christopher "Kreece" Fuchs; Xavier Helgesen; Jeff Kurtzman
- Headquarters: Mishawaka, Indiana, US
- Revenue: $65 million
- Number of employees: 340
- Parent: Better World Libraries
- Website: www.betterworldbooks.com

Better World Books (also known as Qumpus, Inc.) is an American online bookseller of used and new books, founded in 2002 by students of the University of Notre Dame, Indiana.

Better World Books' used book inventory comes primarily from regular book drives at over 1,800 colleges and universities and donations from over 3,000 library systems, in addition to donation boxes found on corners and on college campuses. The company has distribution warehouses in Mishawaka, Indiana; Reno, Nevada; York, Pennsylvania; and Dunfermline, Scotland.

== History ==
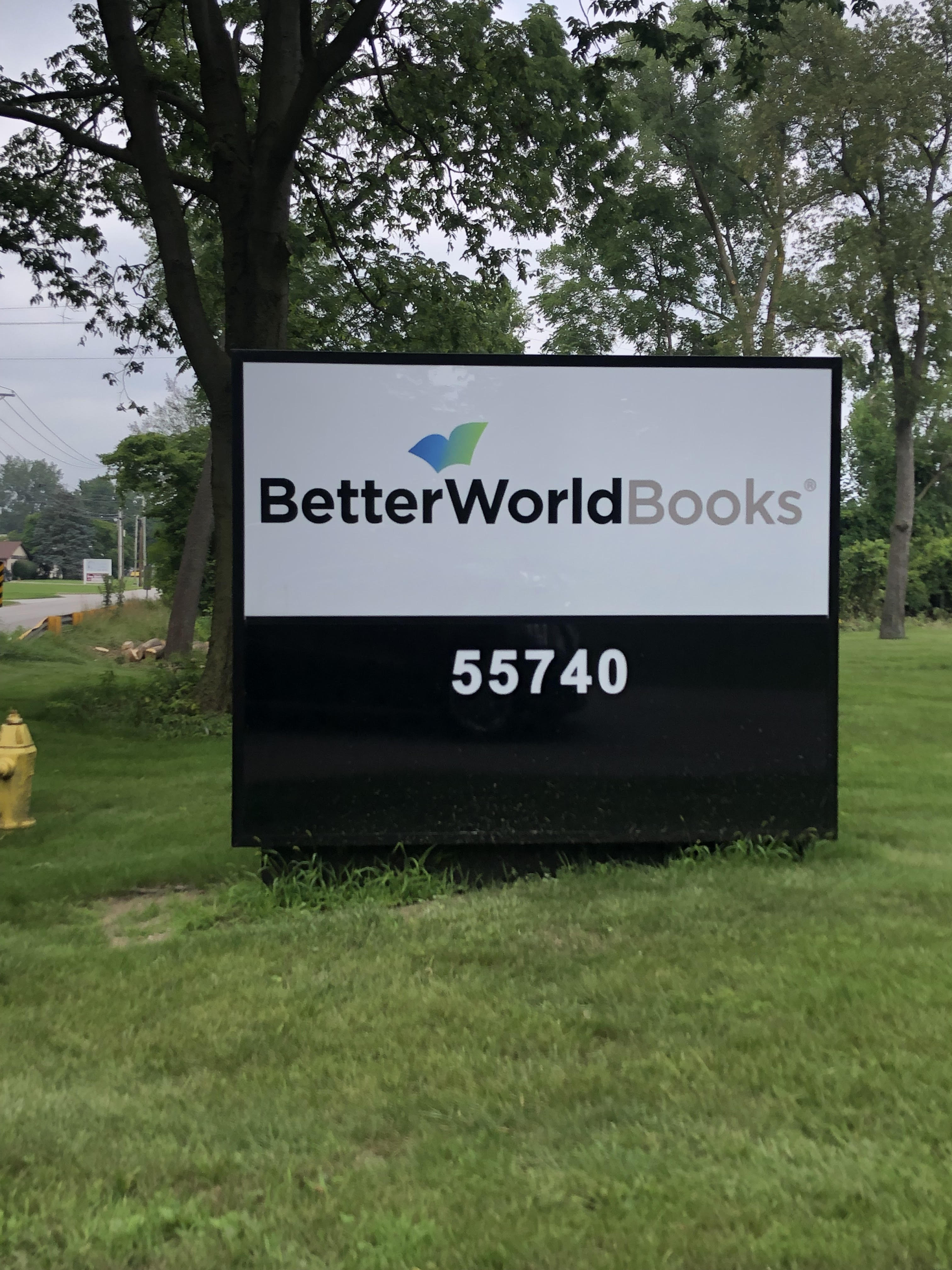
Sign outside the Better World Books world headquarters in Mishawaka, Indiana

In 2001, shortly after their graduation from the University of Notre Dame, Better World Books founders Christopher Fuchs, Xavier Helgesen and Jeff Kurtzman sold their used college textbooks online. The three then formulated a business plan using their experience selling books online. In 2002, Fuchs and Helgesen held a book drive benefiting the Robinson Community Learning Center in South Bend, Indiana. During the drive, they collected and sold 2,000 books, which raised $10,000. Half of the drive's proceeds went to support literacy initiatives at the community center.

In 2003, the three entered their business plan into the Notre Dame Social Venture Business Plan Competition, which was sponsored by the Gigot Center for Entrepreneurial Studies at the University of Notre Dame's Mendoza College of Business. They won the competition, with a grand prize of $7,000 and mentorship from entrepreneur David Murphy. Murphy served as Better World Books president and CEO from 2004 to 2011, before leaving to direct Notre Dame's Master of Entrepreneurship program (ESTEEM).

Better World Books acquired a US Small Business Administration-backed credit line in 2004. In April 2008, Better World Books secured an additional $4.5 million in venture capital via Good Capital, LLC and 18 private investors.

In 2008, the company opened an operation in Dunfermline, Scotland, and started a UK website in 2010. In 2016, the company opened a new distribution center in Reno, Nevada, creating 150 new jobs.

The non-profit B Lab has certified "Better World Books" as a "B corporation", meaning it meets certain standards for social welfare, because it donates books or a percentage of its profit to literacy programs around the world. As of 2013, the company had donated an estimated $14 million under this program.

In March 2019, Better World Books announced the closure of their last retail location in Goshen, Indiana. This was done in order for the organisation to improve its e-commerce operations and reach more people.

The company discloses information about funds raised, books re-used or recycled, and books donated in a ticker on its "Impact" page.

As of 2019, Better World Books handled about 30 million incoming books per year, of which a third were sold and a third donated to partners.

On November 6, 2019, Better World Books was acquired by Better World Libraries, a mission-aligned, not-for-profit organization that is affiliated with longtime partner, the Internet Archive. The plan is to digitize many more books and put them online. Between July 2019 and March 2020, Better World Books donated over 700,000 books (counted by distinct ISBNs) to the Internet Archive. Over 1.4 million books were donated in 2020 and nearly a million in the first half of 2021.

== Partners ==
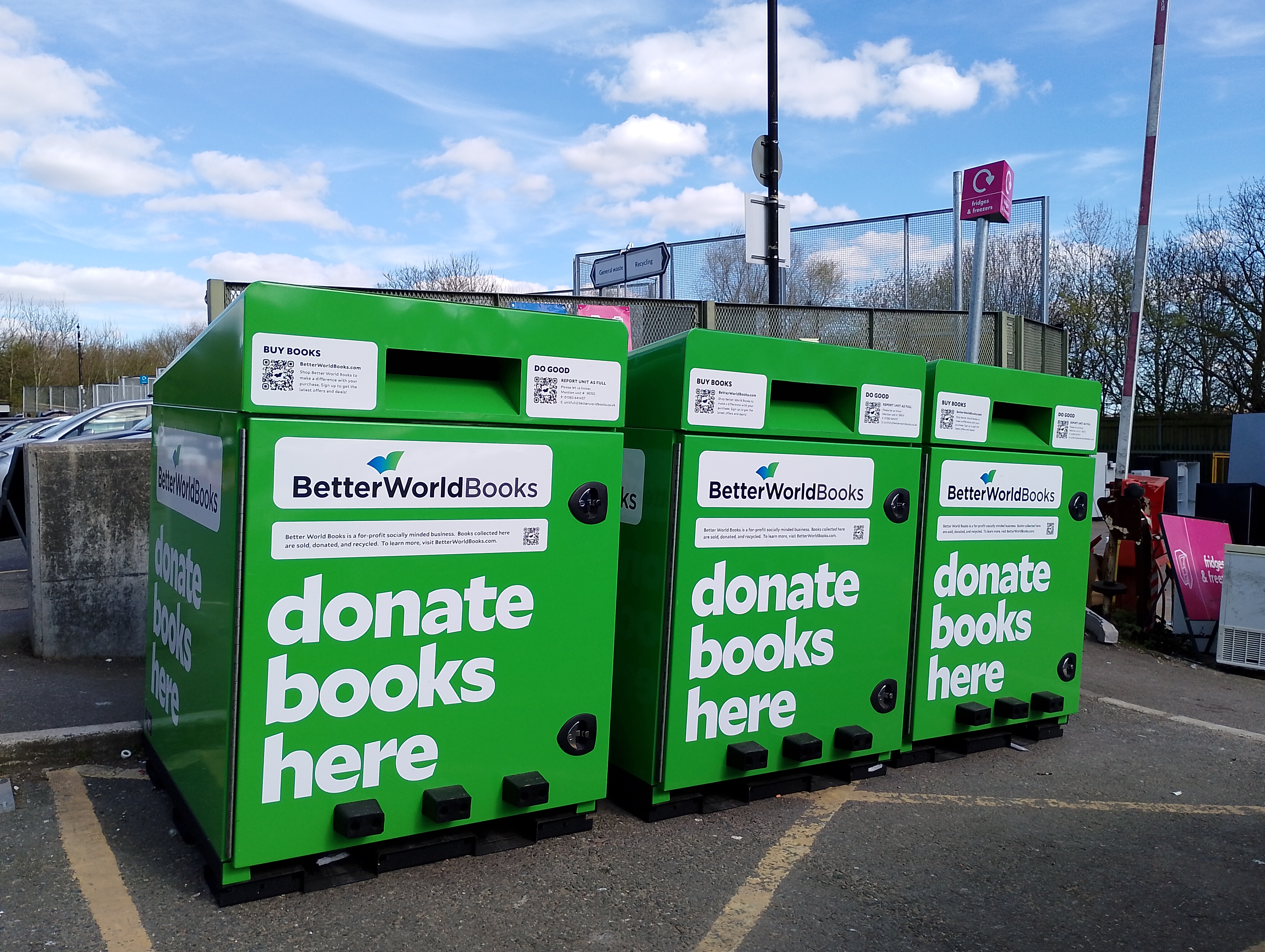
BetterWorldBooks used book bins at a London recycling centre

Better World Books donates one book to Feed the Children, Books for Africa, or smaller donation recipients for each book sold on BetterWorldBooks.com. Better World Books provides additional support to literacy non-profits, including:

- Books for Africa – which collects, ships and distributes books to African children.
- Internet Archive – The Internet Archive and Better World Books announced a new partnership in November, 2019, to digitize books for preservation purposes.
- The National Adult Literacy Agency (NALA) – an independent Irish charity which is committed to making sure people with literacy and numeracy difficulties can fully take part in society and have access to learning opportunities that meet their needs.
- National Center for Families Learning – which provides educational opportunities and literacy programs to at-risk children and families.
- National Literacy Trust – an independent charity based in London, England, that promotes literacy.
- Prison Book Project – a Quincy, Massachusetts–based nonprofit, which provides inmates with books and legal resources.
- READ International – a charity that aims to improve access to education in East Africa by relocating books which are no longer needed in UK secondary schools to Tanzania.
- Robinson Community Center – a University of Notre Dame–affiliated community center, which provides educational opportunities and tutoring services in South Bend, Indiana.
- Room to Read – which builds libraries and schools and provides scholarships in impoverished areas of the world, including Southeast Asia. Room to Read also publishes books for children in multiple languages.
- Worldfund – which provides resources to improve English-language skills in Latin America.

== See also ==
- AbeBooks
- Alibris
- List of online booksellers
- Momox
- musicMagpie
- ThriftBooks
- World of Books
