= Alibris =

Online bookstore

Coordinates: 37°50′3″N 122°17′6.33″W

- Company type: Private
- Industry: Retail (specialty)
- Founded: 1997 in Emeryville, California, U.S.
- Headquarters: Emeryville, California, U.S.
- Key people: Anindo Dey - CEO; Erich Heston - CFO; David Fisher - VP of Engineering; Michael Warchut - Director IS&T
- Products: Used books, out-of-print books, rare books. Also features used or collectible games, music, and movies (albums, cassette tapes, compact discs, DVDs)
- Revenue: $100M (as of 8/15/13)
- Number of employees: 25 (as of 12/1/19)
- Website: www.alibris.com

Alibris is an online store that sells new books, used books, out-of-print books, rare books, and other media through an online network of independent booksellers.

== History ==
Martin Manley founded Alibris in 1997 with the team behind early online book marketplace Interloc, which Alibris purchased. Interloc was founded by book seller Richard Weatherford, programmer Tom Sawyer and computer tech Brad Councilman in 1994.

Interloc was one of the earliest successful efforts to centralize used book data online. It remained a private network until 1996, when the company launched its website built in Thunderstone Texis by Senior Engineer Michael Warchut. The Alibris website was launched on October 23, 1998 at 14:30PM EST also built by Michael Warchut.

Alibris was incorporated in 1998.

Alibris acquired Bibliocity in October 1999.

The company was backed by venture capital until 2006, when it was purchased by Oak Hill Capital Partners, a private equity firm. In February 2010, Oak Hill Capital Partners bought Monsoon and merged it with Alibris with Monsoon Commerce owning Alibris. As of February 2017, Alibris was owned by AM Holding Inc. (formerly Monsoon Commerce Inc.) In 2017 Alibris Holding sold off Monsoon Commerce of Portland and Stonegde Technologies of Collegeville, PA, and Alibris was subsequently sold in June 2017 to a private investor.

The company remains privately owned.

== Company ==
Booksellers list their inventories on Alibris which in turn offers the books on its retail website, a separate library services site, and business-to-business partners such as Barnes & Noble, Half Price Books, Walmart, and eBay. It also offers services in the UK through the Alibris.co.uk website. It offers more than 250 million books from a network of over 6000 booksellers in 65 countries.

Most sales made through Alibris are fulfilled by the bookseller directly to the end customer. Sales to libraries or other institutions or books needing transoceanic shipping are consolidated in a distribution center in Sparks, Nevada. Alibris also has a similar network for music (albums, cassette tapes, and CDs) and movies (VHS or DVD).

Alibris allows customers to buy and sell at the same time. Alibris charges a starting fee that varies based on what is being sold and what kind of commission is charged.

Alibris was a charter member of the Google eBooks service when it was announced by Google on December 6, 2010.

== See also ==
- AbeBooks
- Better World Books
- Biblio.com
- List of online booksellers
- musicMagpie
- World of Books
