= BiblioQuest =

Search service for books based in Bowral, New South Wales, Australia

BiblioQuest International
- Type: Private
- Industry: Retail
- Founded: 1994
- Headquarters: Bowral, New South Wales, Australia
- Key people: Paul McShane, Director; Suzanne McShane, Director
- Products: used books, out of print books, rare books, online used books and BibliOZ.com
- Number of employees: 12 (2007)
- Website: www.biblioquest.com.au

BiblioQuest International is a specialist search service for books, primarily used books and rare or out-of-print titles. The company is based in Bowral, New South Wales, Australia, and is registered with the Australian Securities and Investments Commission as ACN 109 499 265 ABN 88 109 499 265. It owns Australian trademark 723201.

== History ==
BiblioQuest began as a partnership in 1994, eventually incorporating in 2004. The company also owns and manages the BibliOZ.com website, which launched in early 2001. This website began as a reseller program with Abebooks. In 2005 BiblioQuest did not renew its contract with Abebooks and instead created a strategic alliance with Biblio.com and Alibris, as well as commencing its own inventory listing service focused on Australia and New Zealand.

The company has helped foster Australia's first booktown project and in 2002 founder Paul McShane was awarded a Churchill Fellowship in recognition of that work.

== Business profile ==
BiblioQuest International maintains a traditional booksearch service offering telephone and mail order options, as well as online purchasing. It also provides out-of-print booksearching for major bookshop chains and many independent stores throughout Australia and New Zealand.

In 2007 BiblioQuest launched BibliOZ portal sites catering to specific professional clients in the fields of medicine, pharmaceuticals, dentistry, engineering and mining.
