= Book Depository =

UK-based online book seller (founded in 2004)

The Book Depository Ltd.
- Company type: Subsidiary
- Website type: E-commerce
- Available in: English
- Founded: 2004; 22 years ago
- Dissolved: 26 April 2023; 3 years ago
- Headquarters: London, UK
- Area served: Worldwide
- Industry: Bookselling, online shopping
- Products: Books
- Revenue: £69 million (2010)
- Employees: 150
- Parent: Amazon (2011–2023)
- Website: bookdepository.com
- Launched: 2004; 22 years ago

Logo until 2016

Book Depository (formerly The Book Depository) was a United Kingdom-based online book seller. Founded by a former Amazon employee, it operated from 2004 to 2023. It was acquired by Amazon in July 2011. In April 2023, Amazon closed the Book Depository without stating why.

== History ==
The company was founded in 2004 by Andrew Crawford (former Amazon employee) and Stuart Felton. Its motto was to make "All Books Available to All" by improving selection, access and affordability.

It was acquired by Amazon on 4 July 2011. The move led commentators to worry about the 'strangle hold' of Amazon on the UK book market.

On 5 April 2023, Amazon announced that it would be closing down Book Depository on 26 April 2023, and no reason was given.

== Service ==
The company had a large catalogue with a 'less of more' philosophy. It offered pre-included shipping to over 160 countries.

== Awards ==
In 2009 and 2010, it won Direct Bookselling Company of the Year at the Bookseller Industry Awards, and the Queen's Award For Enterprise.

In 2012, Book Depository was a finalist for the Fast Growth Business Awards' Retail/Leisure Business of the Year award, and won two UK Startup Awards, Online Business of the Year and Retailer of the Year.

In 2013, it was ranked 5th in the Sunday Times Fast Track 100.

== See also ==
- List of online booksellers
- AbeBooks
- World of Books
