= World of Books =

British book retailer

Coordinates: 50°49′1.8″N 0°25′18.9″W

- Trade name: Wob (2021–2024); Ziffit (until 2025); Shopiago (until 2025)
- Type: Private
- Industry: Online shopping; Bookselling; Reselling
- Founded: 2005
- Headquarters: Goring-by-Sea, UK
- Area served: Worldwide
- Products: Used books; Out of print books; Rare books; Media articles; Textbooks
- Website: Official website

World of Books is a British online second-hand book retailer. It formerly traded under the names Wob, Ziffit and Shopiago. As of 2018 it was the United Kingdom's largest. The company buys unsold used books, mostly from British charity shops. The books are resold either to consumers through Wob's website and online, or wholesale to recyclers, with about 80% of the books going to recycling. It was certified as a B Corporation in 2019.

== Overview ==
The company purchases books in bulk, paying by tonnage rather than for individual titles. Using custom-designed software, they evaluate each title for saleability and set selling prices accordingly. The company buys used books through shops and recycling merchants, in addition to purchasing books directly from consumers through its proprietary Ziffit, which has a 'scan and send' app. In 2010 alone, the business recycled 26 million books.

Wob belongs to the World of Books Group, which also includes Ziffit and Shopiago, both re-commerce companies. The group describes itself as a "circular economy, for-profit company".

Wob was founded in 2002 by Simon Downes, Ben Maxfield and Michael Laundon, who had bought their first books at car boot sales and auctioned them on eBay.

Annualised turnover in 2009 was £5 million, with a projected turnover for that year of £8.5 million. The business was receiving 140 tonnes per week (about 300,000 books) at their depot, purchased from charities at £75 per tonne.

In 2009 World of Books won the Worthing Business Award for New Business of the Year.

In December 2012 World of Books was ranked in 22nd place in the Sunday Times Fast Track 100. In 2018, it was number 197 in the Sunday Times HSBC International Track 200.

In November 2016 it was sold to a fund by Bridges Fund Management, which bought a majority stake for £13 million. At the time, the company reported collecting more than 25,000 tonnes of books per year from 3,700 charity shops across the UK, out of an estimated 50,000 total tonnes in the market.

In July 2021 Bridges sold a majority stake in World of Books to Livingbridge, a British private equity firm. They rebranded from World of Books to Wob in November 2021.

WoB Foundation is a charity established by the World of Books Group in 2022 to support "causes that support literacy and the circular economy".

== AuthorShare ==
In June 2021 World of Books and Bookbarn International introduced AuthorSHARE, a partnership programme which would pay authors royalties on second-hand sales of their books on the World of Books website.

== Royalties ==
Nr.	Type	Royalty	Remarks
01	New Book	Full Royalty	
02	2nd hand Ordinary	Nil	
03	2nd hand AuthorShare	partial	limited number of sites

== See also ==
- musicMagpie
- Better World Books
- AbeBooks
- Alibris
- Momox
- List of online booksellers
