= Edabaghine Mosque =

Mosque in Tunis, Tunisia

- مسجد الدباغين

Religion
- Affiliation: Sunni Islam

Location
- Location: Tunis, Tunisia

Architecture
- Type: Mosque

Edabaghine Mosque (Arabic: مسجد الدباغين) or mosque of the tanners is a Tunisian mosque in the Medina of Tunis. It does not exist anymore.

== Localization ==
The mosque was located in souk Edabaghine. It has now been replaced by new houses.

== Etymology ==
It was named after the tanners, called Edabaghine in Arabic, who surrounded the mosque.
