= Vinod Viplav =

Indian author (born 1963)

Vinod Viplav (Hindi विनोद विप्लव) (Born 5 November 1963) is an Indian author who writes in Hindi. He wrote books on subjects ranging across film, literature, science and health.

== Bibliography ==
Meri Awaz Suno is the first biography of Mohammad Rafi, written by Vinod Viplav. This book contains rare information and pictures of the life and the song of Mohammad Rafi. He is also editor and publisher of a monthly health magazine, Health Spectrum and Vibhav da ka Angootha was first collection of Stories by Vinod Viplav, which was published by Matrubharti, with financial help from Hindi Academy of Delhi government.

He worked in United News of India.

== Books and publications ==
1. Meri Awaz Suno – Biography of Mohammed Rafi in Hindi
2. The World of Rafi – Collection of Articles on Mohammed Rafi
3. Hindi Cinema Ke 150 Sitare
4. Manasik Rog : Karan Aur Bachav
