= MusicMagpie =

British online retailer

musicMagpie
- Type: Private company
- Industry: E-commerce
- Founded: 2007
- Founders: Steve Oliver, Walter Gleeson
- Headquarters: Stockport and Macclesfield
- Area served: Worldwide
- Key people: Steve Oliver, Walter Gleeson
- Services: Online shopping
- Number of employees: 1,000 (December 2019)
- Subsidiaries: That's Entertainment (2011—2018)
- Website: musicmagpie.co.uk

MusicMagpie Plc (styled as musicMagpie) is a British online retailer buying and selling refurbished electronics and second-hand computer games, consoles, books, films and music.

== History ==
musicMagpie was founded in Stockport in 2007 by Steve Oliver and Walter Gleeson, both with previous experience of the music industry. The company was originally based in Oliver's garage, buying only CDs.

Records show that from February 2017, the company employed 1,000 people, and received 5 million ratings on eBay, becoming the most popular seller on that platform.

By 2018, the company had sold an estimated £125 million of used items, primarily through Amazon and eBay.

In 20 November 2023, companies such as the BT Group and Aurelius Group announced their interests to buy the company.

In October 2024, British electrical retailer AO World announced it would acquire musicMagpie for approximately £10 million. Two months later, the purchase was completed.

== Business model ==
Prices are checked through an algorithm which determines an item's popularity on all competitors' websites. Due to its low prices for items such as CDs, the service is often used by individuals selling in bulk.

Customers can enter an items’ barcode or name into musicMagpie's website to receive an instant quotation. Customers can then send their goods to the company free of charge by various methods. Once the goods are received, if they meet quality requirements, the seller is paid.

The principle behind its purchase and sale algorithm is to keep a minimum stock in the company's warehouse, and continuously buy and sell the same item while listing it on multiple platforms. Depending on an artist's new release, advertisements and other relevant factors, the company tends to increase the stock if expecting to get bigger sales from a specific product. DVDs are typically purchased for 1 penny and books for 20 pence, and then resold for an average of £1 or £2.

Customers can purchase used items through a separate part of the website.

== Poundland and Asda deal ==
The company had a deal with UK budget retailer Poundland, where it supplies them with used CDs, DVDs and Blu-rays, which are sold for one pound as part of Poundland's Replay range.

In August 2020, MusicMagpie ended their deal with Poundland and formed a new relationship with Asda. This involved the sale of used DVDs, CDs and Blu-rays in the store which would be sold on their own dedicated MusicMagpie branded stands in the entertainment section of the store. This deal expanded later on with the introduction of MusicMagpie kiosks in a variety of Asda stores which enabled customers to sell used electronics and other items. Subsequently, after this deal was completed, Poundland's replay range was dropped as a result.

== See also ==
- World of Books
- Better World Books
- AbeBooks
- Alibris
- Momox
