= Say Good Night to Illiteracy =

Children's bedtime storybook series

Say Goodnight to Illiteracy is a children's bedtime storybook series, published annually by Half Price Books through their publishing entity Hackberry Press. All proceeds from the sales of the book are donated by Half Price Books to literacy organizations across the nation such as Reach Out and Read.

The Retail Advertising and Marketing Association (RAMA) honored Half Price Books with the Peter Glen Award in 2004 for the "Say Good Night to Illiteracy" project. It was recognized as a public service that has fostered dreams and creativity of hundreds of writers, raising awareness and funds for the cause of literacy.

Annual release occurs in October. A current edition of the "Say Good Night to Illiteracy" bedtime storybook collection can be purchased at any Half Price Books. All proceeds of new book sales made at Half Price Books benefit non-profit family literacy groups. Some used copies are sold on auction sites such as AbeBooks and Amazon.

Children's stories in the book are a result of the annual writing contest held by the used bookstore chain. Twenty entries are selected each year for publication. Each children's story or poem is matched up with simple, four-color illustrations, provided by professional and student illustrators.

The theme of the book each year is centered on quotations about books, reading and learning. Overall, the theme and purpose of the "Say Good Night to Illiteracy" project is summarized by the Emilie Buchwald quotation, "Children are made readers in the laps of their parents."
