= Martin Manley =

American entrepreneur and politician

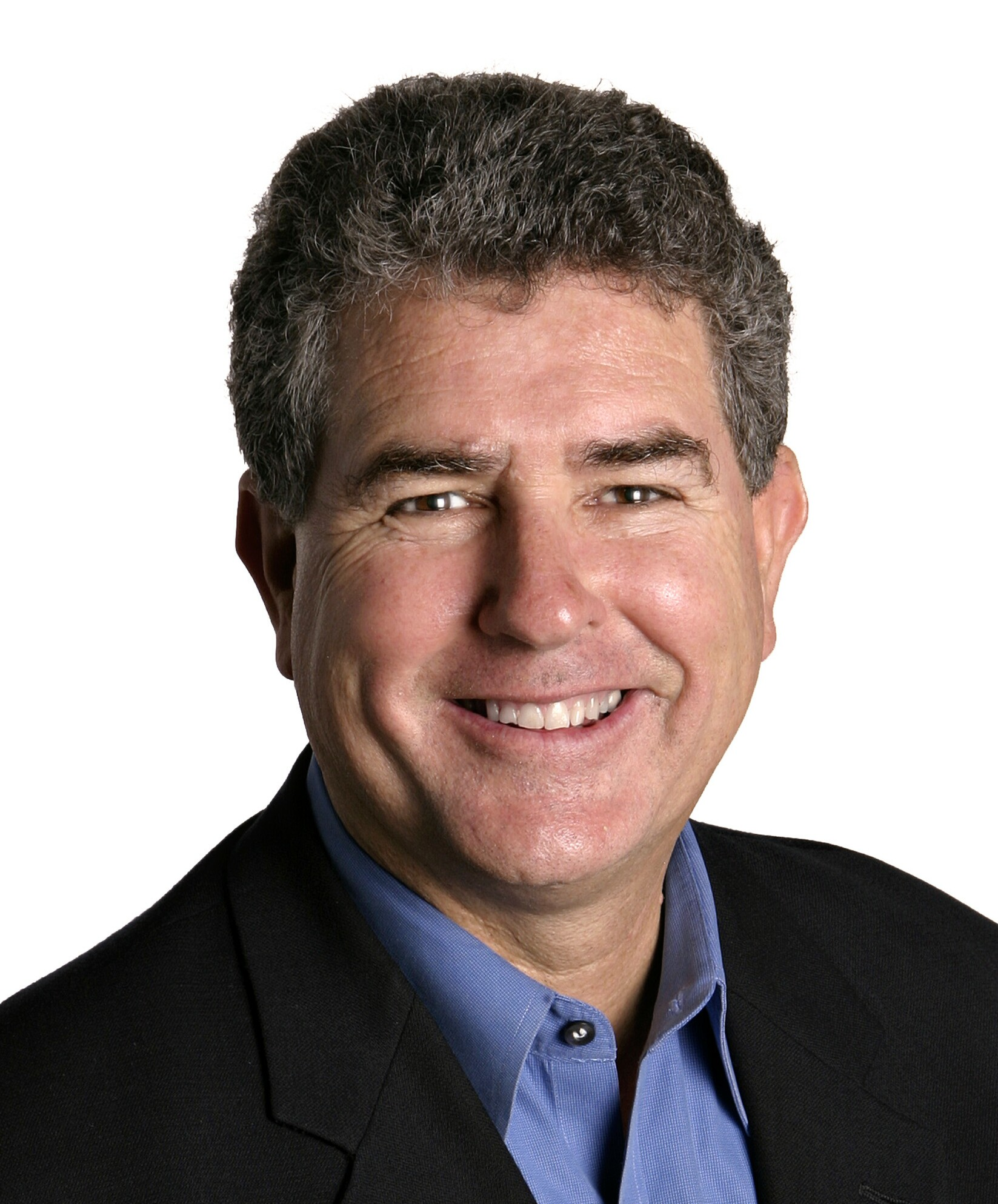
- Born: August 27, 1952 (age 74); Azusa, California
- Education: UC Santa Cruz; Harvard Business School
- Occupation: Executive Director of Hult International Business School San Francisco Campus
- Known for: Founder of Alibris, US Assistant Secretary of Labor under Bill Clinton
- Spouse: AnnaLee Saxenian

Martin Manley (born August 27, 1952) is an American entrepreneur and politician, who is the executive director Hult International Business School's San Francisco Campus. Manley previously served as US Assistant Secretary of Labor under President Bill Clinton. He co-founded the major online bookseller Alibris.

== Early life ==
Manley was born in Azusa, California, the son of Jack Manley and Georgia Rodecker. He graduated from Lowell High School in Whittier, California and UCSC, with honors degrees in Politics and Community Education. In 1987, he received his Master of Business Administration from Harvard Business School.

== Career ==
During the 1970s and early 1980s, Manley became a prominent California labor organizer. He held positions with the Hotel & Restaurant Workers in Monterey, California (now UNITE), Hospital Workers Local 250 of the Service Employees (SEIU), and the International Association of Machinists and Aerospace Workers (IAM). He was among the earliest union organizers in Silicon Valley, directed a large community-based campaign in Silicon Valley during the 1984 US Presidential election, and was a frequent and prominent critic of AFL-CIO President Lane Kirkland.

In 1993, the newly elected Bill Clinton nominated Manley as US Assistant Secretary of Labor. Following his Senate confirmation, Manley served under Secretary of Labor Robert Reich as head of a new federal agency, which became the US Department of Labor's Office of the American Workplace (OAW). The OAW was charged with promoting innovation in US workplaces.

=== Alibris ===
In 1997, Manley founded the major e-commerce bookseller Alibris and served as the company's CEO for 10 years. Alibris integrates inventory from second-hand booksellers from around the world and is considered a classic example of a long tail ecommerce retailer.

In 2000, Alibris became a significant Internet retailer. By 2005, Alibris was named by the Deloitte Fast 500 and Silicon Valley Fast 50 list as one of North America's fastest growing technology companies. That same year The New York Times declared that Alibris had "radically changed the buying and selling of used books".

Oak Hill Capital acquired Alibris in 2006. Manley then stepped down as CEO of Alibris in 2010 and was succeeded by Brian Elliot, the company's president and COO.

=== Hult International Business School ===
Since May, 2013, Manley has served as the Executive Director of the San Francisco campus of Hult International Business School – a business school that in ten years has grown to become one of the largest and most global business program in the world. The San Francisco campus in Levi's Plaza currently enrolls more than 900 graduate students from more than 100 countries in one-year degree programs that enable students to rotate to Hult campuses in Boston, New York City, London, Dubai, and Shanghai.

== Personal life ==
Manley resides in Oakland, California and is married to AnnaLee Saxenian, Dean of the Information School at UC Berkeley.
