= Souk Edabaghine =

Coordinates: 36.8009°N 10.1768°E

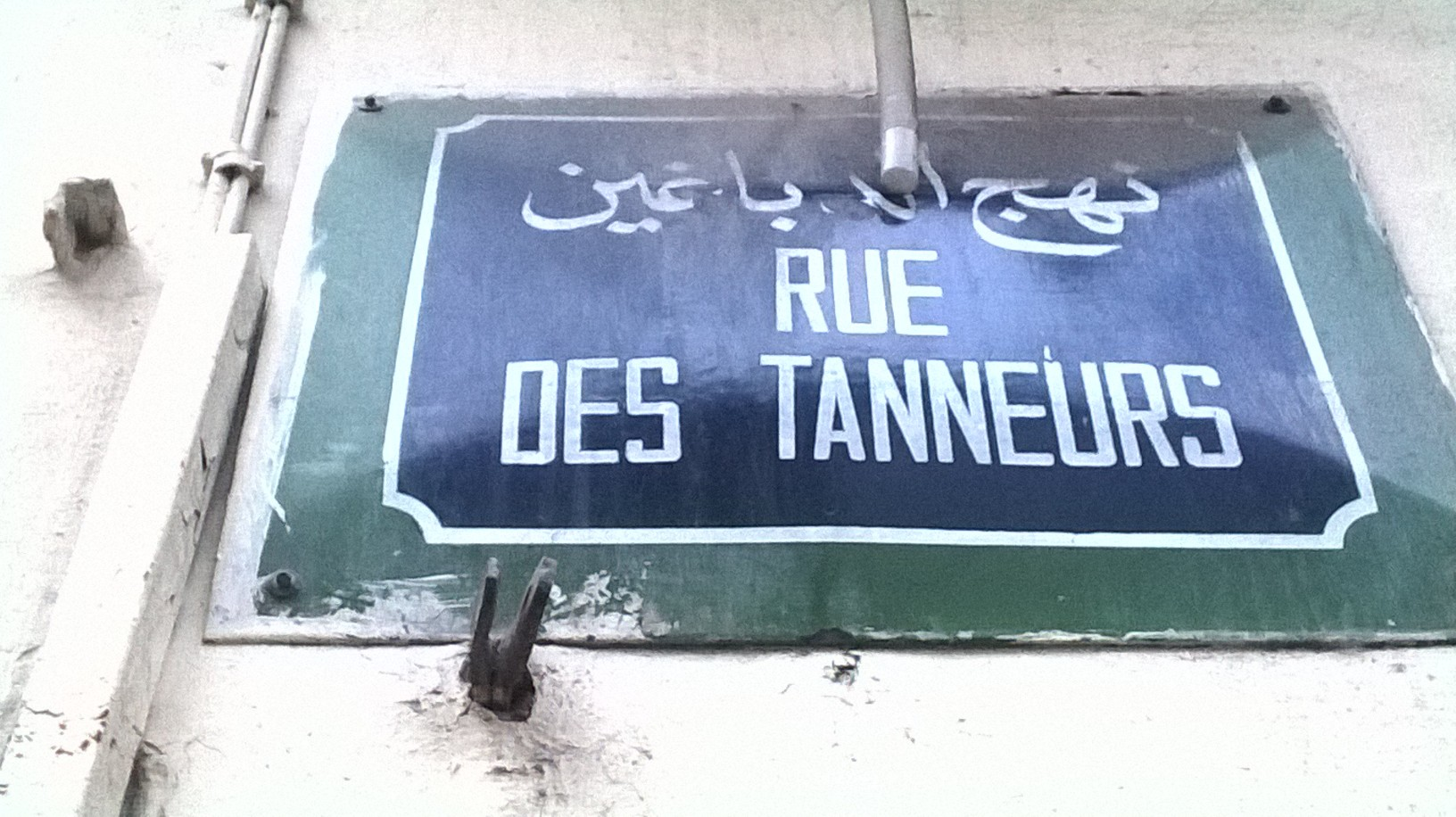
Metal sign indicating the Tanners Street or 'Souk Edabaghine'

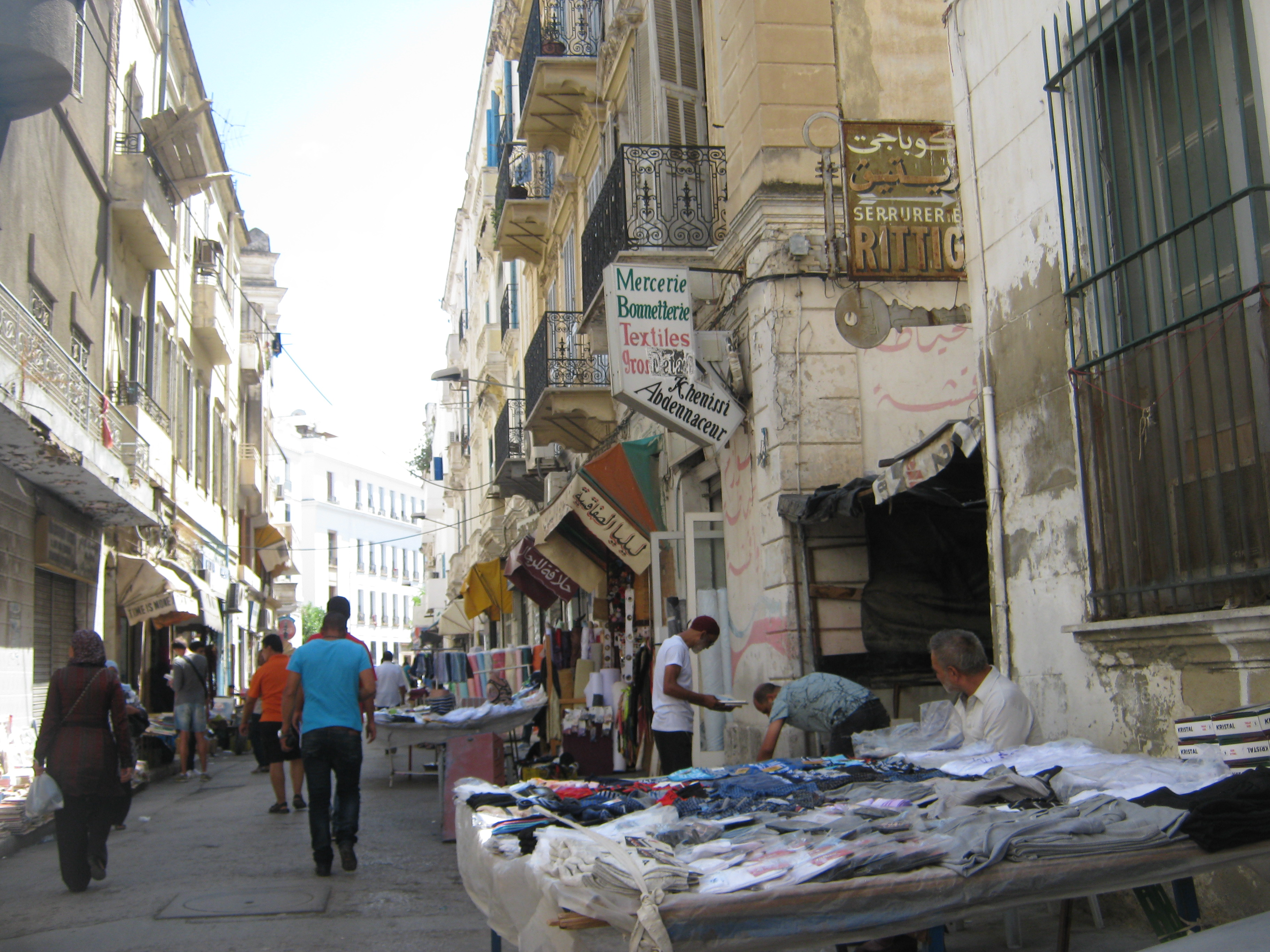
A view of Tanners Street

Souk Edabaghine (Arabic: سوق الدباغين; English: Tanners market), is one of the souks of the medina of Tunis. It is called Edabaghine, the Arabic word for tanners, because it was specialized in leather tanning.

Since this was considered a polluting industry, the souk was located at the outskirts of the medina. The souk connects Mongi Slim Street, previously named Street of Maltese, and Rome Street.

When the tanning industry disappeared, antique and used book sellers in all languages and on all subjects, took over the souk. Today there are about twenty book sellers.
