= Zavvi =

British music and entertainment retailer

- Logo used from 2007 to 2009.
- Founded: September 2007; 19 years ago
- Dissolved: February 2009; 17 years ago
- Predecessor: Virgin Megastores UK
- Successor: Zavvi.com
- Founders: Simon Douglas and Steve Peckham
- Products: Music, entertainment

Zavvi was a British music and entertainment retailer, founded in September 2007 by Simon Douglas and Steve Peckham purchasing and renaming the UK division of Virgin Megastores. In December 2008, the retailer entered administration, and the final stores closed down in February 2009.

== History ==
In September 2007, it was announced that the UK arm of the Virgin Megastores brand was to break away from the Virgin Group. A management buyout offer was led by managing director, Simon Douglas, and finance director, Steve Peckham, reportedly for just £1. Zavvi became the largest independent entertainment retailer in the UK. All 125 stores traded under the Zavvi brand, although some stores retained an individual Virgin Media concession that operated independently from the Zavvi store. In October 2007, the company updated its logo to feature a Z in the dot of the i.

Zavvi Ireland had made a loss of €3.4 million in the year ending March 2007. In September 2007, Douglas announced that Zavvi would focus on the sale of games to compete with Game and Gamestation. Plans were revealed for Zavvi to differentiate itself from its competitors with limited editions and exclusive products in addition to increasing the stores online market share during the next year. Following a trial period, it was announced on 28 March 2008 that all Zavvi stores would feature a book department.

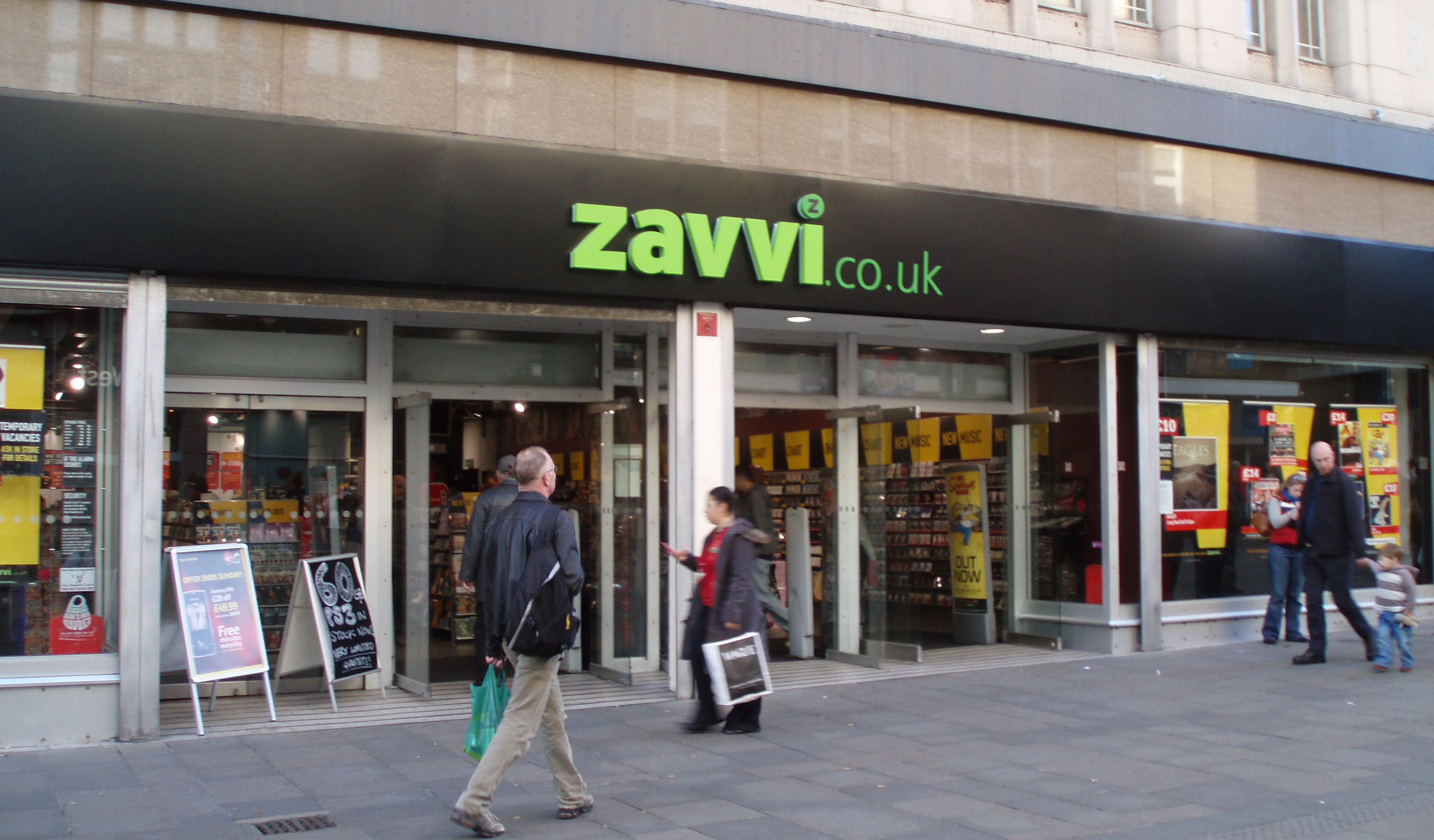
A Zavvi store in Newcastle upon Tyne.

Prior to entering administration, Zavvi was in the process of creating an online download service, Zavvi Downloads, intended to compete with services including Napster and the iTunes Store. It was planned the service would offer music which would not carry any digital rights management, meaning that it could be transferred to any portable music player without restrictions. It would also have a catalogue of films and TV shows, games and mobile content. On 15 January 2009, Ernst & Young announced that Zavvi Downloads was scrapped as the company entered administration.

=== Administration ===
In December 2008, The Daily Telegraph reported that Zavvi was seeking help from the Virgin Group to guarantee millions of pounds worth of its stock payments to Woolworths' Entertainment UK (EUK) as EUK had entered into administration. The Times reported that Ernst & Young might step in if Zavvi could not pay EUK the value of the stock which amounted to a £106 million debt. Zavvi was forced to shut down its online operations as it entered into talks with EUK and Deloitte & Touche, EUK's administrators. A spokesman for Virgin said that a deal had been done with the administrator of Woolworths, which accepted £40 million to settle the debt. On 8 December 2008, Zavvi suspended its sale of gift cards citing the problems with its supplier, EUK, as the cause.

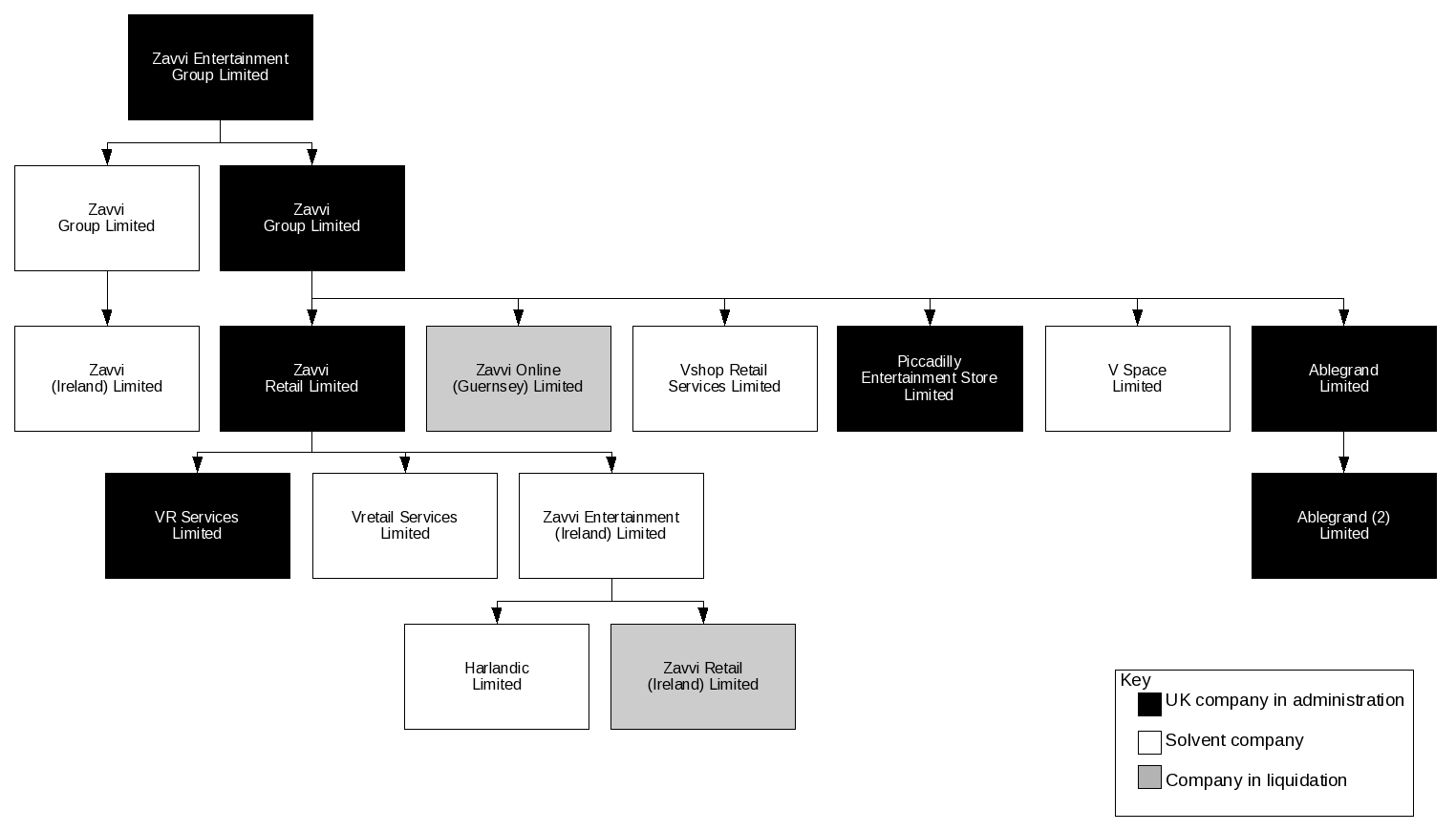
The Zavvi Group of companies hierarchical structure (February 2009).

On 24 December 2008, the Zavvi UK group went into administration owing to the loss of its supplier as the company was unable to source stock. Zavvi had attempted to buy supplies from alternative suppliers but experienced difficulties in obtaining favourable credit terms or acceptable prices. This placed pressure on the company's working capital and when quarterly rents of approximately £13 million were due on 25 December 2008, the directors were unable to meet their creditor liabilities.

Ernst & Young LLP was appointed administrator, and Zavvi continued to trade while a buyer was sought. Zavvi Guernsey was liquidated, but Zavvi Ireland was not at the time subject to any formal insolvency proceedings. At the time of administration, Zavvi had 114 stores in the UK and 11 in Ireland, employing 2,363 permanent staff and 1,052 temporary staff. All stores opened as normal on Boxing Day / Saint Stephen's Day, 26 December, for the normal post-Christmas sale. Zavvi Ireland entered liquidation in January 2009. On 13 January, Zavvi Entertainment Group Limited entered administration.

In January 2009, HMV revealed that it had acquired five stores in Ireland and nine in the United Kingdom, saving 269 jobs. The purchase price for the nine UK stores was approximately £630,000. Head Entertainment, a company created by former managing director Simon Douglas and his business partner Les Whitfield, purchased five stores. A total of 222 employees together with the remaining Zavvi stock were transferred to Head, and the total purchase cost was £111,000.

In February 2009, the final Zavvi stores were closed. Following the closure, That's Entertainment bought some former units.

== Zavvi.com (2009–2026) ==
In February 2009, The Hut Group (THG) bought the Zavvi assets from administration. Zavvi.co.uk was relaunched on 2 March 2009. The website was renamed from Zavvi.co.uk to Zavvi.com in October 2009. No physical stores were re-opened.

In July 2023, THG confirmed the sale of its OnDemand division, including Zavvi, to its existing leadership team as ZavviGroup Ltd, with financial backing from investment firm Gordon Brothers.

On 12 October 2026, ZavviGroup entered administration and ceased trading with immediate effect.
