= Andrew Crawford (entrepreneur) =

Andrew Crawford (born 27 July 1971) is an Irish entrepreneur and the founder and former CEO of The Book Depository. He was born in Zambia, of Irish heritage. Crawford was educated at Downside School and then The University of Liverpool studying engineering science and industrial management. After a brief spell working for his family firm, Crawford worked in the 1990s in security and specialist risk management working as a private security contractor throughout EMEA.

Having been part of the startup team for Bookpages.co.uk sold to Amazon.com, he went on to found The Book Depository in 2004 which is working to make "All Books Available to All". It was also later sold to Amazon.

Crawford is also founder of Dodo Press, a publisher which reissues up to 200 classic titles a week.

He is a regular columnist for The Bookseller.

== Sources ==
- Crawford, Andrew (15 January 2009). "The weakest link". The Bookseller.
- Crawford, Andrew (15 November 2009). "Delivering the goods". The Bookseller.
- Jones, Philip (19 January 2011). "Sales grow 70% in first half at The Book Depository". The Bookseller.
- Moules, Jonathan (22 February 2008). "Reading between the lines to find where the money is". Financial Times.
- Neill, Graeme (22 August 2008). "Book Depository plans overseas drive". The Bookseller.
- Maguire, Adam. "Irishman sells niche online book retailer to Amazon". The Irish Times.
- "Amazon plot thickens in Book Depository buyout". Belfast Telegraph.
- "Booksellers fear 'stranglehold' as Amazon snaps up British rival The Book Depository".
- "Calligo Limited Successfully Complete a $2.6m Investment Round With a Further $5m Credit Line". Market Wired.
