= Books for Africa =

US-based non-profit organization

- Emblem of Books for Africa
- Founded: Founded in 1988; 38 years ago, officially recognized 501(c)(3) in September 1993
- Founder: Tom Warth
- Type: NGO
- Legal status: 501(c)(3) nonprofit public charity
- Purpose: To end the "book famine" across the African continent
- Headquarters: Saint Paul, Minnesota
- Key people: Fatima Lawson (President); Grayce Belvedere-Young (Secretary); Jote Taddese (Treasurer); Patrick Plonski, PhD (Executive Director)
- Revenue: $33.6 million (2023)
- Website: https://www.booksforafrica.org/

Books For Africa (BFA) is a 501(c)(3) nonprofit organization dedicated to collecting, sorting, shipping, and distributing books to children and adults in Africa. BFA is headquartered in St. Paul, Minnesota, US, and has warehouses in St. Paul and Marietta, Georgia. Books For Africa is the largest shipper of donated text and library books to the continent, shipping over 50 million books and serving all countries in Africa since 1988. In the fiscal year of 2020, BFA shipped 3.7 million books valued at over $38 million, 167 computers and e-readers containing nearly 300,000 digital books, and six law and human rights libraries to 20 African countries. More than $3.2 million was raised in the same year to ship these books to the students of Africa.

== History ==
Books for Africa was founded in 1988 by Tom Warth following a visit to a library in Uganda where access to books was limited. The experience made Warth recognize the widespread shortage of educational supplies across many African nations and inspired the creation of the organization.

Books for Africa officially became a 501(c)(3) nonprofit organization in 1993 and later established warehouses in the United States to support their large-scale book collection and distribution efforts.

== Operations ==
Books are typically transported in cargo containers and rely on partner organizations, otherwise called "consignees" such as African Vision of Hope and Clean Water Ambassadors to carry out the distribution process to local schools and libraries. In order to cover shipping costs ($11,000 to ship a 40-foot container with approximately 22,000 books to an African seaport), Books for Africa relies on donations and partners with Better World Books, a social venture company that runs book drives to raise funding for literacy-based nonprofits. Better World Books is BFA's largest single source of funding and their largest source of post-secondary books. In many cases, approximately $0.50 is sufficient to send one book to Africa.

== Volunteer Involvement ==
The organization has nearly 10,000 annual volunteers as of 2026. Volunteer efforts include fundraisers led by school clubs and student led organizations, which tend to be organized independently and include efforts in Marietta, Georgia, Darien, Connecticut, and Brea, California.

== Recognition ==
Books for Africa has received nine consecutive 4-star ratings from Charity Navigator, as well as a 100% rating in accountability and transparency. It meets all standards set by the Charities Review Council.
