= Virgin Megastores UK =

Retail chain in the United Kingdom from 1971 to 2007

Virgin Megastores UK was a retail chain that operated in the United Kingdom from 1971 to 2007. The company was established by Richard Branson, originally as a small record shop, and grew into a national chain. In 2007, the company was sold to its management and was rebranded as Zavvi. Zavvi entered administration in 2008 and eventually closed.

== History ==
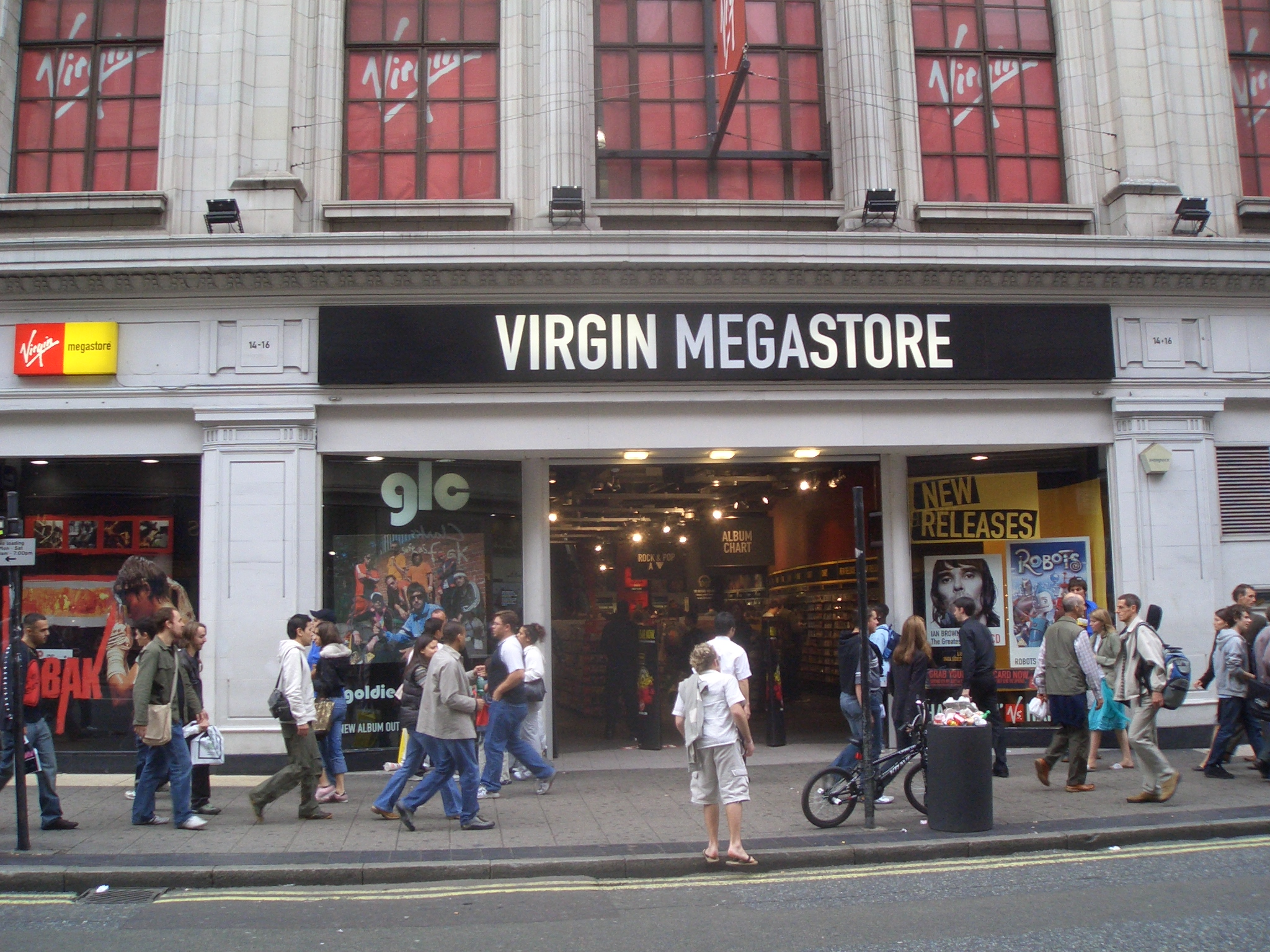
The flagship Virgin Megastore in Oxford Street

=== Branson's early business ventures ===
Richard Branson & Nik Powell had initially run a small record shop called Virgin Records and Tapes on Notting Hill Gate, London, specialising particularly in "krautrock" imports, and offering bean bags and free vegetarian food for the benefit of customers listening to the music on offer. After making the shop into a success, they turned their business into a fully fledged record label, Virgin Records. The name Virgin, according to Branson (in his autobiography), arose from a colleague of his when they were brainstorming business ideas. She suggested Virgin – as they were all new to business – like "virgins". The first release on the label was the progressive rock album Tubular Bells by multi-instrumentalist Mike Oldfield in 1973.

=== First store ===
Having set up a mail order business from Richard Branson's bedroom, Virgin's first formal store opened on Liverpool's Bold Street in January or February 1971 (exact date uncertain) This was followed by a store in London's Oxford Street.. In 1979 the company opened their first Megastore at 14-16 Oxford Street (at the intersection of Oxford Street and Tottenham Court Road) in London. Virgin Megastores and Virgin Records operate as entirely separate entities, like many of the other Virgin companies. Throughout the 1980s and 1990s Virgin Megastores opened over 100 stores in the UK, and many others around the world. Simon Wright – Chief Executive of the Virgin Entertainment Group from 1999 to 2009 was very instrumental in the worldwide growth of the stores in particular developing the stores in Asia, the Middle East, Australia and North America before their eventual disposals under licence detailed under Ownership.

=== Sale and rebrand ===
In 2007 the Virgin Group was looking to sell the UK and Ireland stores. On 17 September 2007, it was announced that the UK and Ireland arm of the Virgin Megastores brand was to break away from the Virgin Group. A management buy-out offer was accepted. EUK, the company's main stock supplier, also the supplier to shops like Woolworths and Sainsbury's, have helped out with the MBO by investing heavily to support the new management team. With the change of ownership the Virgin Megastores disappeared and were replaced with a new name 'Zavvi'. All 125 stores remained trading and the change was fully implemented by late November 2007. In January 2008 the online system was also rebranded to "zavvi.co.uk" and Virgin Megastores Ireland changed to 'Zavvi Ireland'.

On Christmas Eve, 24 December 2008, the "Zavvi UK" group went into administration following the collapse of Woolworths, which owned Zavvi's supplier Entertainment UK. Simon Douglas, the founder of the entertainment retailer stated: "We have done all that is possible to keep the business trading, but the problems encountered with EUK, and particularly its recent failure, have been too much for the business to cope with." By February 2009, Zavvi had closed its stores, selling some to rival HMV, and a few to Simon Douglas and Les Whitfield's Head Entertainment.

== Services ==
A service called Virgin Megastores Radio (VMR) used to broadcast from its home in the Oxford Street store to the rest of the Megastores. Later this service was stopped and shops played CDs from stock over their own in-shop stereo systems.

Employees of Virgin Megastores and Virgin XS/Xpress in the UK and in the Republic of Ireland (with exception Virgin XS/Xpress stores were not in Ireland) wore Virgin branded black T-shirts with "Need Help? Just Ask" written on the front and "The V Team" on the back. Senior members of staff wore a MOD (Manager on Duty) lanyard. Only the Assistant Manager and Store Manager wore name badges, which also stated their position.

=== Technology ===
The computer system at the heart of the UK Virgin Megastores was ELVIS (EPoS Linked Virgin Information System) which was designed for Virgin in 1991. ELVIS collects data from shop's point-of-sale terminals for stock and sales reporting; provides instant information for customers on all the shop's product lines, holds play list information for Virgin Megastore Radio (accessible by all shops simultaneously); and allows for electronic re-ordering from suppliers. As of September 2006 ELVIS was updated to use Real Time Polling. This means that now all inventory updates every 15 minutes, giving an accurate representation of on hand stockholding as well as being a useful tool for producing Best-Seller reports.

Virgin also had an online service, http://www.virginmegastores.co.uk, which stocked the same entertainment products as the high street shops and had a 48-hour home delivery guarantee with gift wrapping. An individual service is used by stores to deliver items currently out of stock to customers. The system is called 'Web-Enabled Store' (WES).

== Virgin XS ==
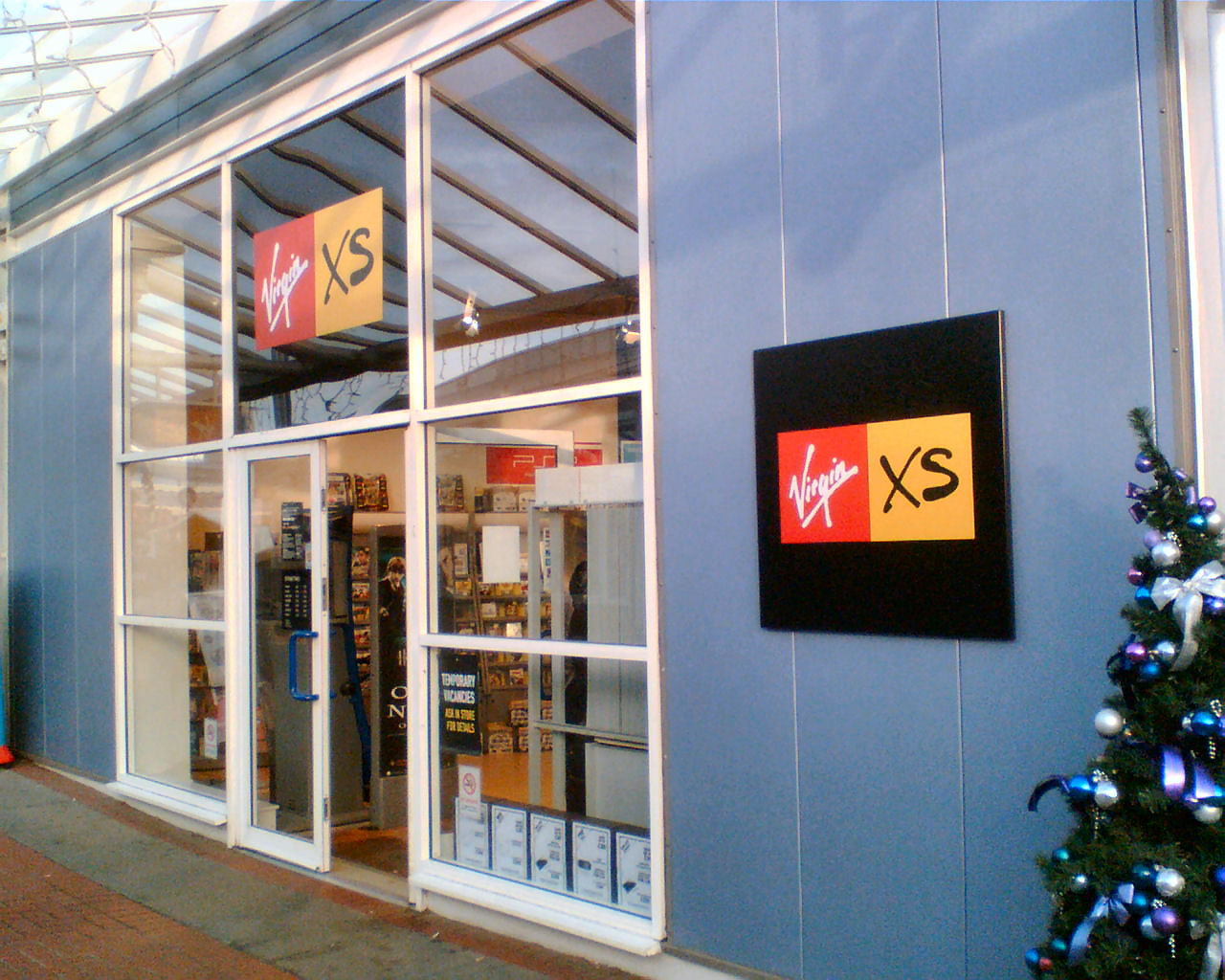
Former Virgin XS Store

Virgin XS became the clearance arm of Virgin when they were taken over from Sound and Media. Who had set them up to sell off overstocks and deletions from all the major record companies. There were approximately 17 Virgin XS shops and they were all located in mainly small units within factory outlet centres throughout the UK. Virgin XS shops stocked the same charts as normal Virgin Megastores but they also sold all Virgin Megastores sleeveless stock (stock without their original packaging) at reduced prices as well as having various multibuy offers on back catalogue stock.

The chain was originally part of the Sound and Media Group (which itself was part of the Virgin Group). The Virgin XS stores were also sold to Zavvi in 2007. These stores did not retain any distinction between them and the ordinary Zavvi stores, as they carried the standard Zavvi branding. All the Outlet stores were closed in January 2009 due to Zavvi entering administration.

== Competition ==
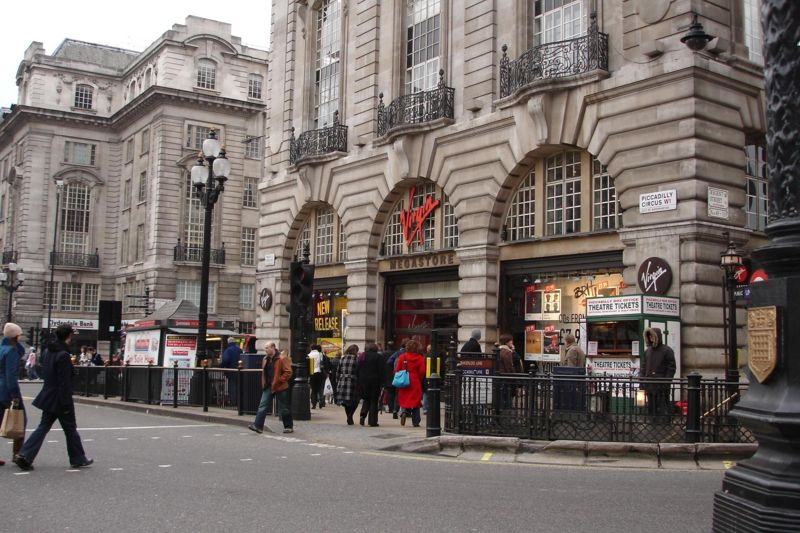
Former Virgin Megastore in Piccadilly Circus

As more and more high street shops and e-tailers entered the entertainment sales market, it became more competitive. Big name supermarket chains in particular stocked popular music and DVDs at ever-lower prices. The video game market was also increasingly competitive. These trends affected Virgin Megastores' profits.

In response to the increasing choices available to purchasers of entertainment media, the Virgin chain employed several strategies in an attempt to secure customer loyalty, and focussed on higher standards of customer service. The 'Addict card' was introduced in 2005, offering customers a stamp for every £10 spent in the shop; 10 stamps entitled customers to £10 off their next purchase. Also introduced was the 'Mega-sharp' approach to customer service: staff were encouraged always to ensure that customers found everything they were seeking.

Competition against independent retailers mainly in the music sector did not pose a major threat for big companies such as the Megastores at the time of the Zavvi rebranding. However, customers with a specialist taste usually found the independent shops more appealing, offering more hard-to-find and rarer titles; the firm also suffered from the growing competition from online retailers.
