= Brotherhood Books =

Brotherhood Books is an Australian online secondhand bookstore founded in 2009. It claims to offer a selection of more than 60,000 titles. The bookstore operates as a social enterprise, with its profits supporting the operations of the anti-poverty charity Brotherhood of St Laurence. Brotherhood Books is also known for selling rare and collectible titles.
