= Half Price Books =

American book retailer

Half Price Books, Records, Magazines, Inc.
- "We buy anything printed or recorded except yesterday's newspaper".
- Type: Private
- Industry: Retail (Specialty)
- Founded: 1972; 54 years ago
- Headquarters: Dallas, Texas
- Number of locations: 120 (2023)
- Key people: Sharon Anderson Wright (CEO); Kathy Doyle Thomas (president)
- Products: Books, Records, CDs, DVDs, Magazines, Video Games
- Website: hpb.com

Half Price Books, Records, Magazines, Incorporated, is a chain of new and used bookstores in the United States. The company's original motto is "We buy and sell anything printed or recorded except yesterday's newspaper." Many of the used books, music, and movies for sale in each location are purchased from local residents. The corporate office is located in the flagship Northwest Highway location in Dallas, Texas. Half Price Books operates more than 120 stores, including outlets, in 19 states.

== History ==
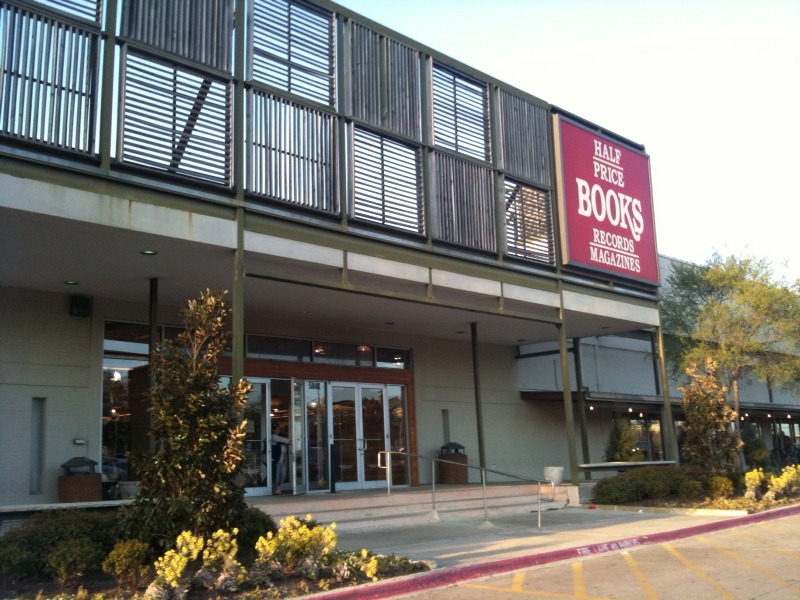
Entrance to the Half Price Books Northwest Highway, the corporate headquarters, on E. Northwest Highway in Dallas, Texas

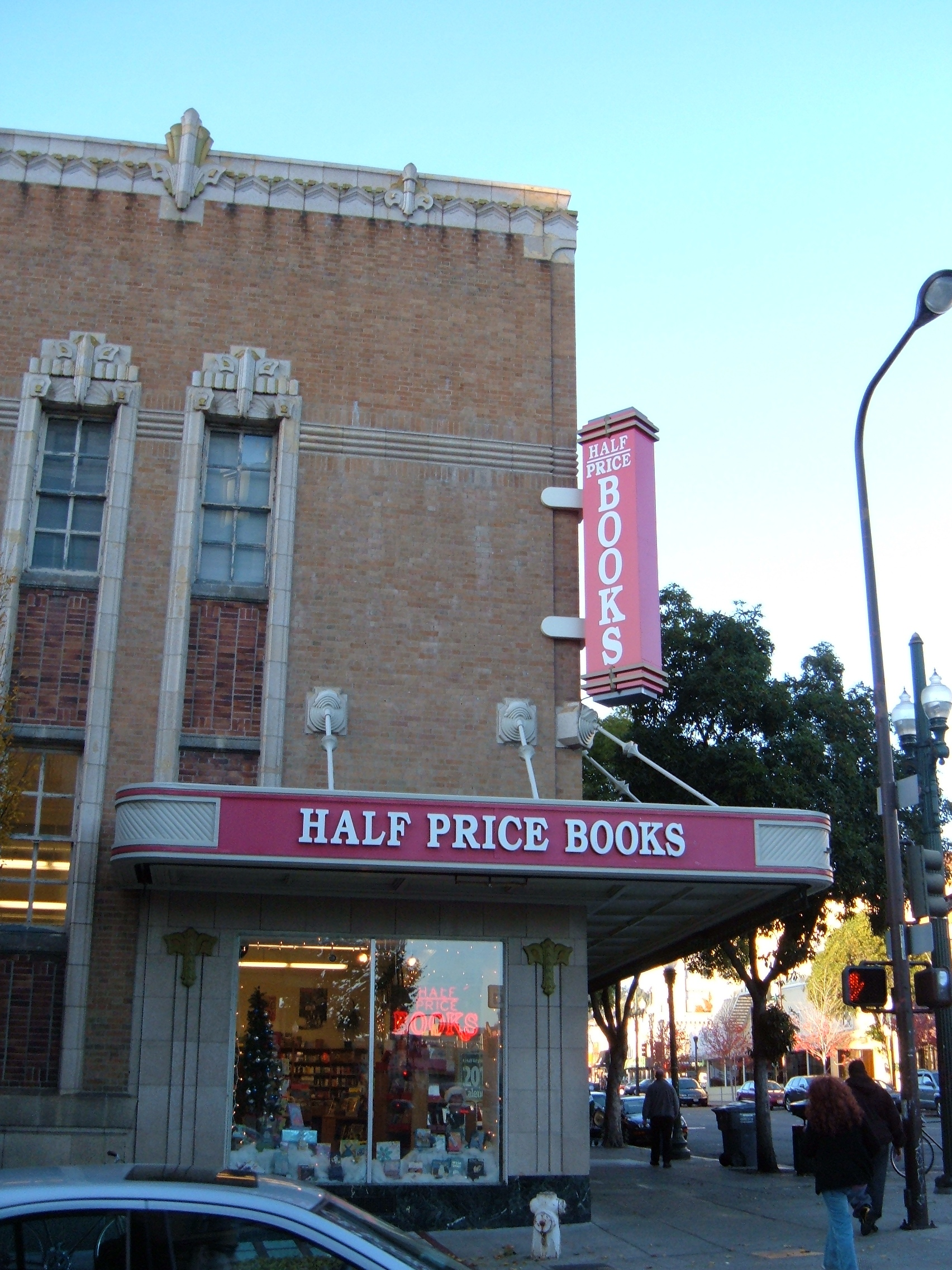
Half Price Books in Berkeley, California

Founders Ken Gjemre (1921–2002) and Pat Anderson (1931–1995) opened the first store in 1972 in a former laundromat in Dallas, Texas, stocking the shelves with 2,000 books from their personal libraries. Pat Anderson's daughter, Sharon Anderson Wright, is the company's CEO, and Kathy Doyle Thomas is the president. In 2009, Sharon's sister, Ellen O'Neal, assumed the position of chairperson of the board.

== Philanthropy ==
The original mission statement of Half Price Books includes a commitment to "promote literacy and be kind to the environment." To support this, the company offers teachers and librarians a year-round 10% discount on purchases. Each store holds an annual book drive to collect new or gently used children's books, which are used to establish "Half Pint Libraries" at local non-profit organizations and schools.

The company also manages its paper, energy, and water resources. In 2008, the chain established "B(eco)me Green," an environmental education initiative designed to share information about environmental health.

In addition, the chain donates millions of overstock books annually to non-profit organizations around the world, including Feed the Children and the American Red Cross. It also supplies books to Better World Books, a for-profit online bookseller.

== Publishing ==
Half Price Books publishes a portion of its inventory by reprinting public domain titles or acquiring the U.S. or English language rights from other publishers. The company releases these titles through its publishing division, Hackberry Press.

The Hackberry Press catalog includes Say Good Night to Illiteracy, a children's storybook series with 13 editions in print. Proceeds from the series are donated to family literacy organizations, including Reach Out and Read and the National Center for Family Literacy.

== Wholesale ==
Founded in 1983, Texas Bookman is the wholesale division of Half Price Books and is also headquartered in Dallas. Texas Bookman sells trade and scholarly remainders at discount prices to wholesale buyers worldwide. In April 2020, the division began selling directly to businesses with a customer application and proof of tax-exempt or resale status on file through its website. They do not sell directly to consumers. In May 2022, Texas Bookman hosted its first annual trade book show, the Texas Remainder Expo (TRex), where exhibitors from across the US and UK showcased their latest inventory available for wholesale purchasing at discounted prices.
