= That's Entertainment (retailer) =

British retail company

That's Entertainment was a British retailer of second-hand DVDs, CDs and video games. The company traded across the United Kingdom.

== History ==
That's Entertainment was launched in 2010, buying former Zavvi units.

In February 2018, owners MusicMagpie announced that all That's Entertainment stores would close by May 2018, citing competition from rivals HMV and CeX.
