= BookFinder.com =

Vertical search website owned by Amazon

- Website type: Comparison shopping website
- Owner: AbeBooks (Amazon)
- Website: bookfinder.com
- Commercial: Yes
- Launched: January 30, 1997; 29 years ago
- Current status: Active
- Written in: Perl

BookFinder.com is a vertical search website that helps readers find and buy new, used, rare, out-of-print books and textbooks online.

Among the books from sellers whose inventories are indexed, users can compare prices for over 150 million books for sale and purchase titles directly from the bookseller, without a markup. The search engine focuses primarily on English, French, German, Italian, and Dutch language titles.

== History ==
BookFinder.com was founded in 1997 by Anirvan Chatterjee, then a student at the University of California, Berkeley. Originally known as MX BookFinder, it was relaunched as BookFinder.com in 1998 and established as a standalone company based in Berkeley, California in 1999.

In 2005, BookFinder.com was acquired by AbeBooks, which itself was purchased by Amazon.com on August 1, 2008.

BookFinder.com started operating in Europe under the JustBooks brand in 2006. The network includes JustBooks sites for France, Germany, the Netherlands, and the United Kingdom.

== See also ==
- Wired for Books
