= Biblio.com =

Online marketplace for rare and collectible books

- Company type: Private, Online retailer
- Available in: English, Spanish
- Founded: 2000; 26 years ago
- Headquarters: Asheville, North Carolina, United States
- Area served: Worldwide
- Founder: Brendan Sherar
- Industry: Retail (Specialty)
- Products: Used books, rare books, out of print books, new books and textbooks
- Employees: 14 (2023)
- Website: www.biblio.com

Biblio is an independently owned international online marketplace specializing in rare and collectible books.

Biblio was established in 2000 in Asheville, North Carolina, by Brendan Sherar and Michael Tracey. Biblio also provides e-commerce solutions and web services to multiple professional bookseller associations, including the Antiquarian Booksellers Association of America (ABAA), the International League of Antiquarian Booksellers (ILAB), the Antiquarian Booksellers Association (ABA), and the Australian and New Zealand Association of Antiquarian Booksellers (ANZAAB).

== History of Biblio.com ==
Biblio was founded in 2000 as a rare book metasearch service, and in 2003 launched its own book marketplace website, Biblio.com, which is the primary product of the company. Since 2003, Biblio has sold over 7.5 million books, including new and used titles. Biblio launched localized versions of Biblio.com in the UK in 2009 and then in Australia and New Zealand in 2017 to better serve those markets.

Biblio launched its first non-English site, Biblio.es, in August 2022, with the goal of expanding its reach into Spanish speaking markets in both Europe and Latin America. El País, a prominent Spanish newspaper, recognized Biblio.es as a prestigious source for rare books.

== Technology and Web Services ==
As part of its core product, Biblio provides inventory management tools for its booksellers in a feature suite known as BiblioDirect. Sellers can maintain their inventory and catalogue information, as well as route their inventory to other digital book marketplaces.

Biblio provides e-commerce and web services for several professional bookselling associations, starting with a 2009 partnership with the ABAA in conjunction with Bibliopolis, where Biblio built a white-label marketplace for ABAA member inventory. Biblio has also designed, managed, and hosted websites for the IOBA, ABA, ILAB, and ANZAAB associations. The IOBA partnership ended in 2022.

== Biblio's Auction and Book Sales Archive ==
In early 2024, Biblio, in collaboration with the ABAA, secured exclusive rights to the American Book Prices Current (ABPC) database, which consisted of over 50 years of detailed book auction records. Biblio then created the Auction and Books Sales Archive, which is a combination of the historical ABPC auction records and Biblio's own historic sales data. The Auction and Book Sales Archive has an expected launch of June 2024.

== Partnerships and Virtual Book fairs ==
In 2020, Biblio partnered with the ABAA to design, build, and host a virtual book fair platform to act as a substitute for the in-person book fairs that were cancelled due to the COVID-19 pandemic. Biblio also maintains and hosts virtual book fair websites for the ABA.

In 2022, Biblio launched its own virtual book fair platform, Biblio.live.

== Corporate Structure and Philosophy ==
Biblio is independently owned and operated, and is the largest independently owned book marketplace. As part of its triple bottom line business structure, Biblio participates in several charity and social responsibility initiatives. Internally, Biblio has been certified as a living wage business every year since 2012, and Biblio has been contributing a set amount monthly to NativeEnergy through its carbon-neutral shipping program.

As a core part of its brand, Biblio focuses its social responsibility efforts on increasing and supporting literacy worldwide. Biblio founded Biblioworks, a non-profit foundation dedicated to building libraries and increasing literacy in Bolivia. Biblioworks dissolved in 2020, having built 17 libraries throughout Bolivia. In 2023, Biblio partnered with the Indigenous Literacy Foundation, giving customers the opportunity to round-up their purchase to support literacy initiatives within Indigenous communities in Australia.

== See also ==
- List of online booksellers
