= READ Tanzania =

Organization promoting literacy in Tanzania

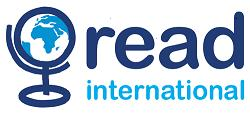
- Founded: 2004
- Type: International organization
- Location: Tanzania
- Origins: Started as the Nottingham Book Project
- Region served: Tanzania
- Product: Provision of educational resources to schools in Tanzania.
- Website: http://www.readtanzania.or.tz

READ Tanzania is a charity (NGO), formerly known as READ International that aims to improve access to education in East Africa by renovating school libraries and providing educational materials. READ began as a United Kingdom-based charity but has since moved operations mostly to Tanzania.

== Overview ==
READ International began life in 2004 as a Book Project based at the University of Nottingham, founded by a group of students following a gap year teaching in Tanzania. Since 2005 READ has shipped a total of 1,303,890 books to Tanzania and renovated 110 libraries to improve access to these books. Since registering as a charity they have had their work recognised in a number of ways, winning Best New Charity in the Charity Times Awards 2007, finalists in the Guardian Charity of the Year Awards 2009, and finalists in the Charity Times Awards in 2009.

READ International also won the Best "Business-Charity Partnership" award at the Institute of Fundraising Awards 2010 and the "International Aid and Development Award" at the UK Charity Awards 2010. In 2014, READ changed their focus from shipping books from the UK and international volunteering projects to raising funds for direct renovations and book purchases in East Africa with support from local students.
