= Campuses of Hult International Business School =

Hult International Business School
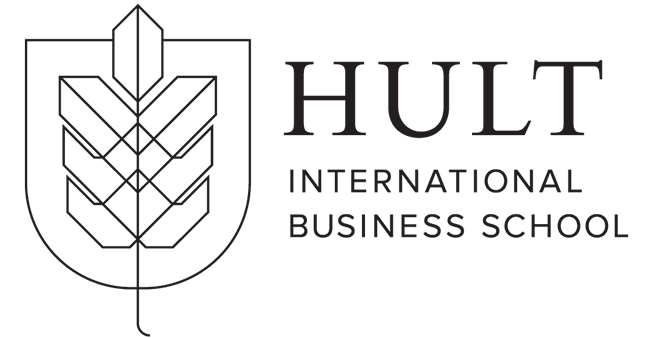
- Type: Private business school
- Campus: London, UK San Francisco, USA Boston, USA Dubai, UAE Shanghai, China New York City, USA Ashridge, UK
- Website: www.hult.edu

The Campuses of Hult International Business School, a private business school, are located in Boston, London, San Francisco, Dubai, New York City, and Shanghai.

== Programs ==
Hult maintains offers its undergraduate programs at three campuses (in London, Boston, and San Francisco).

Hult's different postgraduate programs are offered at all of its 8 campuses. Hult's Ashridge Executive Education is housed in the Ashridge Estate, in England.

== Campuses ==
Image	Name	Location	Founded	Curriculum	Notes
	Ashridge Estate Campus	Ashridge, England, United Kingdom	1959	Postgraduate campus.	Home of Ashridge Executive Education.
	London PG Campus	London, England, United Kingdom	2007	Postgraduate campus.	
	Boston Campus	Cambridge, Massachusetts, United States	1964	Undergraduate and postgraduate campus.	Houses a segment of the Berlin Wall.
	London UG Campus	London, England, United Kingdom	2014	Undergraduate campus.	Converted from a grade-II listed disused brewery by British firm Sergison Bates Architects.; Won a RIBA National Award in 2015.
	San Francisco Campus	San Francisco, California, United States	2010	Undergraduate and postgraduate campus.	
	Dubai Campus	Dubai, Emirate of Dubai, United Arab Emirates	2008	Postgraduate campus.	
	Shanghai Campus	Shanghai, Yangtze River Delta, China	2011	Postgraduate campus.	
	New York Campus	New York City, New York; United States	2014	Postgraduate campus.	
