= ThriftBooks =

US-based online used bookseller

ThriftBooks LLC
- Type: Private
- Industry: Retail
- Founded: 2003
- Founders: Daryl Butcher, Jason Meyer, Hector Rivas
- Headquarters: Tukwila, Washington
- Key people: Hector Rivas, CEO (2003-2014); Kenneth F. Goldstein (current CEO); Mike Ward (current Chief Innovation Officer)
- Products: New and used media: books, DVDs, etc.
- Owner: MMF Capital Management LLC, KCB Management LLC
- Number of employees: 900 (2020)
- Website: www.thriftbooks.com

ThriftBooks is a large web-based used bookseller headquartered near Seattle, Washington, that sells used books, Blu-ray discs, DVDs, CDs, VHS tapes, video games, and audio cassettes. Its business model "is based on achieving economies of scale through automation".

== History and platform structure ==
Selling over 165 million books since its inception in 2003, ThriftBooks is considered one of the largest sellers of used books in the United States and has seven warehouses across the United States. ThriftBooks was founded in the summer of 2003 by Daryl Butcher and Jason Meyer, who were shortly joined by Hector Rivas after a few months. The founders created software that organizes and lists thousands of book titles per day. Rivas, who was the company's first CEO and served in that role for 10 years, helped build ThriftBooks' early inventory by purchasing books in bulk from charitable organizations such as Value Village, the Salvation Army, and Goodwill. Since 2004, ThriftBooks also developed consignment partnerships with libraries by helping the libraries sell unsorted excess inventory in exchange for a percentage of the profits. The first library systems to join were three in Washington state: King County, Pierce County, and North Central Regional Library.

During the 2000s, Rivas led ThriftBooks to become Amazon's largest third-party retailer. In 2006, as ThriftBooks was rapidly expanding, Rivas told the Puget Sound Business Journal that "we're going to take over the world". By 2009, ThriftBooks had expanded out of the Seattle area to operate additional warehouses in Detroit, Portland, and Atlanta, purchasing up to 2 million books a month. In 2010, the company sold its 10 millionth book. In 2011, the company received financial backing from private equity firm KCB Management.

ThriftBooks is popular among book collectors—particularly with those shoppers choosing to avoid retail giant Amazon—for being one of few North American online bookselling platforms that is not a subsidiary of Amazon. ThriftBooks offers a loyalty program called Reading Rewards in which points earned from purchases can be redeemed for free books.

ThriftBooks opened a 190,000-square-foot (18,000 m^{2}) processing center in Phoenix, Arizona in 2021. Kenneth F. Goldstein currently serves as the Chairman and CEO, and Mike Ward is the Chief Innovation Officer of ThriftBooks.

== See also ==
- List of online booksellers
