= Maremagnum =

Italian online book marketplace

Maremagnum (from Latin, lit. 'great sea') is a Milan-based vertical search site for books. It was founded in 1995 in Milan by Sergio Malavasi, the owner of the Libreria Malavasi; its website went live in 1996.

== Name ==
The site was named after the Maremagnum omnium materiarum of Francesco Marucelli.

== History ==
Maremagnum was founded in 1995 by Sergio Malavasi, the owner of the Malavasi bookshop in Milan. The website was launched in 1996, displaying inventory from six Italian bookstores.

The site's goal is to promote the ancient book online.

In 1995, Maremagnum inaugurated Vecchi Libri in Piazza, an exhibition and street market for old and used books held on the second Sunday of each month from September to July in Piazza Diaz, Milan. In 2022, it had over 100 exhibitors.

== Other services ==
Maremagnum also operates Marelibrorum, an online database of bibliographic data and valuations. In 2007, it was a cofounder of the Marelibri search engine for books.
