= Wired for Books =

Web site hosting audio files

Wired for Books was an online educational project of the WOUB Center for Public Media at Ohio University in Athens, Ohio. Created and produced by David Kurz, and launched on May 25, 1997, the website featured author interviews, dramatic audio productions of classic literature, poetry readings, short stories, lectures, essays, and children's literature.

Nearly 700 uncut audio author interviews conducted by Don Swaim for his Book Beat show on CBS Radio were available at Wired for Books in their entirety. Original unabridged audio productions of Alice's Adventures in Wonderland, A Christmas Carol, Macbeth, and The Wonderful Wizard of Oz could be found at Wired for Books in RealAudio streaming media as well as some downloadable MP3 files. Essayists, fiction writers, and poets read their works, often with commentary. Kids' Corner, the children's section of Wired for Books, featured the stories of Beatrix Potter and other classic stories for children.

== Reception ==
In 1999, the website was awarded the Streamers WebSage Award from RealNetworks for the best educational use of streaming media. In 2004, Education World rated Wired for Books an A+. In 2006, Wired for Books was chosen by the National Endowment for the Humanities as one of the best online sites for education in the humanities, and eTech Ohio presented the 2006 Program of the Year Award to Wired for Books as part of the Ohio Public Broadcasting Awards for Radio.

On November 20, 2007, Wired for Books was featured in PC Magazine's "Best of the Internet" column. In June 2016, due to changes in staffing and resources for the management of wiredforbooks.org, the Don Swaim files were provided to Alden Library at Ohio University (where the original master tapes are held) - and the website went dark. The URL was sold to an unrelated organization. At about that time, many of these interviews have been posted on the Ohio University digital collection website for free downloading from the public and are listed as the "Don Swaim Collection."
