= National Center for Families Learning =

Organization set up to create educational and economic opportunity

The National Center for Families Learning (NCFL; formerly the National Center for Family Literacy) is an organization founded to create educational and economic opportunity for the most at-risk children and parents in the United States.

== History ==
The nonprofit organization was founded in 1989 by Sharon Darling as the National Center for Family Literacy.

The mission of the NCFL is "to eradicate poverty through educational solutions" and resources that "empower" families. The organization seeks to alter generational poverty by uniting parents and their children as learners together.

Since 1989, over a million families have been impacted by the NCFL's work. NCFL pioneers family literacy models, and approaches to help improve the lives of the nation's at-risk children and families through greater literacy.

== Mission ==
The NCFL works to help eradicate poverty through family education. Partnering with educators, literacy advocates, and policymakers, it develops and implements programming, professional development, and resources for families. Since 2019, the NCFL has pursued "three distinct strategies to develop holistic solutions that address... family learning", and "systemic issues that cause cyclical, generational illiteracy and poverty": three online learning websites for implementing "hands-on family learning strategies"; the Parent Leadership Institute in Dallas; and The Dallas Coalition, which is tasked with writing a strategic literacy plan for the city, informing local policy, securing funding opportunities, and developing a shared vision".

== Activities ==
The National Center for Families Learning partners with Better World Books, Toyota, and other literacy advocates to help fund its many initiatives.

Until August 1, 2025, NCFL owned free, online, brain-building resources, Wonderopolis and Wonderopolis Camp.

== Publications ==
- Connecting Families and Work: Family Literacy Bridges the Gap (2001)
- The Family Literacy Answer Book: A Guidebook for Teachers and Administrators of Family Literacy Programs (1997)
