= Matrubharti =

Online community themed around reading and writing

- Website type: Online self publishing; Digital storytelling
- Available in: Hindi; Gujarati; Bengali; Marathi; Malayalam; Kannada; Telugu; English; Urdu
- Founded: February 2015; 11 years ago
- Headquarters: Ahmedabad, Gujarat, India
- Creators: Mahendra Sharma; Nilesh Shah
- Subsidiaries
- Website: matrubharti.com
- Commercial: Yes
- Registration: Optional
- Users: 25Lakh (2.5 Million)
- Current status: Active

Matrubharti is an Ahmedabad-based free self publishing online portal that allows users to read and publish original stories, biographies, articles, novels, poetry in Indian regional languages by directly obtaining content from authors and publishing it as eBooks in six languages of India including Gujarati, Hindi, Tamil, Marathi, Malayalam, Bengali, Kannada and Telugu.

== History ==
It is founded in February 2015, to introduce new writers to readers in the regional space, Mahendra Sharma, who launched Matrubharti at the New Delhi World Book Fair.

In the initial stage, it was a self-funded platform but thereafter the creators raised funding Rs 20 lakh from Viridian Capital, in March 2015. and raised another 3.24 crores $32 million from US-based Gujarati angel investors Surya Holdings and Ferrana LLC in 2019.

Since 2015, the Ahmedabad-based company The Times of India, Mint mentioned that, "Matrubharti has helped more than 20000 authors registered and have published 4,350 eBooks and 8..5 lakhs of eBooks downloaded.

The platform claims that it has over 2.5 Million registered and 250,000 users.
