= Momox =

Online exchange for used books

momox SE (until 13 December 2022: Momox AG, before 1 December 2021: Momox GmbH) is a Berlin-based recommerce site for used books and media founded by Christian Wegner in 2004.

Wegner has said that "momox" stands for "Moderner Medien Online Express-Ankauf" 'Modern Media Online Express Purchase'.

== History and development ==
Wegner started selling used items in 2004 with 1500 € start-up capital and 20 square metres (220 sq ft) of storage space, selling on eBay and Amazon. In May 2006, he founded Momox GmbH and the momox.de web site for buying books, CDs, and DVDs. The selling site Medimops opened in 2007.

In 2010, other investors joined the company, including the venture capital investor Acton Capital Partners from Munich. Wegner reduced his stake to 67 per cent. The company expanded to France, Austria, and Great Britain in 2011. In the same year, storage capacity was expanded with two new logistics centers in Leipzig and Neuenhagen bei Berlin, in addition to the headquarters in Berlin, and a pick-up service was offered. In 2013, Wegner handed over his position on the board to Heiner Kroke and focused on expanding the business model for the fashion sector. The following year, Momox launched the online platform ubup.com (“used but precious”), now renamed momoxfashion.com – an online shop for buying and selling second-hand clothing from well-known clothing brands. Thanks to increased international activity in the media sector and accelerated growth in the trade of branded clothing, revenue grew from €150 million in 2016 to €200 million in 2018 and in 2019, Momox had € 250 million in sales.

At the end of 2018, the Norwegian private equity firm Verdane Capital acquired a significant stake in the company. As of 2019, the majority owner is Verdane Capital of Norway, and Wegner has sold all his shares.

Due to Brexit, the company discontinued its service on momox.co.uk in December 2021. On 2 December 2021, momox changed its legal form from a GmbH to a Aktiengesellschaft.

In 2022, Momox expanded to Spain and Italy. On 14 December 2022, its corporate registration changed from a German Aktiengesellschaft (AG) to a Societas Europaea (SE).

== Locations ==
- Headquarters in Berlin
- Logistics centre in Leipzig (900 employees and 70,000 square meters of floor space (as of January 2021), since 2011, books and media): According to the company, 50,000 packages are shipped there every day
- Logistics centre in Neuenhagen bei Berlin (clothing)
- Logistics centre in Stobno, Poland (books and media)
- Two additional locations in Poland: Szczecin and Przecław

== Reception ==
Based on the number of customer reviews on Amazon Marketplace, Momox ranks first with its German sales channel medimops and fourth with its French sales channel momox-shop.fr. In 2012, Momox received the Zukunftspreis Brandenburg for its "innovative start-up followed by breathtaking development." According to an article on the German television magazine WISO, in 2021, Momox processed books sent in by customers incorrectly, declaring them "unsellable" or "not sent", but then offering them for sale on Medimops.

== See also ==
- List of online booksellers
- musicMagpie
