= AbeBooks =

Amazon subsidiary online marketplace

- Type: Subsidiary
- Founded: 1995; 31 years ago
- Headquarters: Victoria, British Columbia, Canada 48.4335°N 123.3798°W
- Area served: Worldwide
- Parent: Amazon (2008–present)
- Subsidiaries: BookFinder.com; LibraryThing (40%); ZVAB.com; IberLibro
- Website: abebooks.com

AbeBooks (/ˈeɪb.bʊks/ AYB-buuks) is an e-commerce global online marketplace with seven websites that offer books, fine art, and collectables from sellers in over 50 countries. Launched in 1996, it specialises in used, rare and out-of-print books. AbeBooks has been a subsidiary of Amazon since 2008.

== History ==
In 1995, AbeBooks was founded by Rick and Vivian Pura, and Keith and Cathy Waters. It was incorporated in 1995 and launched its websites in 1996, initially including listings for only four bookstores. The company name "Abebooks" is derived from their original name, "Advanced Book Exchange". From the late 1990s to 2005, AbeBooks had reseller agreements with eBay, Half.com, Barnes & Noble.com, BibliOZ.com and Amazon.com, allowing AbeBooks to market and sell booksellers' books through those channels; these agreements were dissolved in 2005. AbeBooks currently has a reseller agreement only with Amazon.com.

In 2001, AbeBooks acquired Germany's JustBooks GmbH online book marketplace, which helped the company expand into the German, French and British online bookselling markets. In 2002, the founding partners were bought out by German media company Hubert Burda Media. In 2004, the company expanded its model to include new books, and acquired the Spanish company IberLibro, to better serve Spanish language markets. In 2005, it acquired BookFinder.com, an American book price comparison service. In 2006, the company acquired Fillz, a book-inventory and order-management company, and purchased a 40% stake in LibraryThing in May, a social networking and book cataloging website for bibliophiles.

In June 2008, AbeBooks was awarded the British Columbia Technology Industry Association Impact Award for Leadership in Social Responsibility for its charitable activities, literacy initiatives, and commitment to environmental friendliness in its business practices.

In December 2008, the company was sold to Amazon.

In 2018, the company announced it would no longer fully support sellers from a number of countries, including South Korea, Hungary, and the Czech Republic. Several hundred other sellers pulled their inventories from the AbeBooks site in protest.

AbeBooks is headquartered in Victoria, British Columbia, Canada, with its European office in Düsseldorf, Germany. The company manages regional websites for North America, France, Germany, Italy, the UK and Spain. Most of its inventory consists of used books, including rare, signed, first editions or out of print books. It has been named one of British Columbia's Top Employers every year since 2008.

== Most expensive sales ==
In February 2015, ABE recorded its most expensive sales up to that time: a rare illustrated ornithology book was sold on behalf of one of its dealers for $191,000. Other high-end sales included Areopagitica: A Speech for the Liberty of Unlicenc'd Printing To the Parliament of England by John Milton and a first edition of The Hobbit by J.R.R. Tolkien, each for $65,000. The website periodically reports their recent high value sales.

== Searchable inventory ==
AbeBooks' users can search across the listings of many independent bookstores. Some of the member bookstores offer their books online only, while others also maintain a regular storefront.

Booksellers upload their inventory data to the AbeBooks database, specifying information about each book including condition and price. Prices are fixed (with US$1 being the minimum) and there are no auctions. Items available range from the extremely common, where there might be hundreds of copies listed, to first editions and signed books worth thousands of dollars. In addition to books, the marketplace also offers periodicals and journals, fine art such as prints and posters, vintage photographs, maps, sheet music and paper ephemera such as postcards, letters and other documents.

== Sellers ==
Sellers pay a monthly subscription to list their books on the site, ranging from $25 to $500, depending on how many books they list. This subscription fee has been in place since at least April 2008. In addition, sellers pay a percentage fee for each book sold via the websites.

AbeBooks initially offered its services for a flat listings fee, based on the number of titles listed for sale. The model was changed in the early 2000s to include a commission on sales. In April 2006 AbeBooks started mandatory processing of MasterCard and Visa credit card transactions on behalf of its sellers and added a 5.5% charge for the provision of this service: previously this service had been optional. In 2008, AbeBooks started charging a commission of 13.5% on the cost of postage as well as the book price. Currently (2013) the commission charge is set at 8% of postage and book price.

Sellers can, within limits, set their own standard postage rates to various countries or by different carriers. Booksellers can upload their inventory using their own spreadsheet software or via the site's interface. Items that sell are mailed directly from the individual bookseller's location. Some booksellers have new books directly mailed from wholesalers or publishers. Most booksellers who list on AbeBooks also list their books on similar marketplaces such as Amazon.com.

== Websites ==
AbeBooks's localized storefronts, which differ in language and currency, are differentiated by top-level domain and country code:

Region	Site
United States	abebooks.com
United Kingdom	abebooks.co.uk
Germany	ZVAB.com
Germany	abebooks.de
France	abebooks.fr
Italy	abebooks.it
Spain	iberlibro.com
Canada	abebooks.ca
Australia	abebooks.com/books/anz

Similar websites include BookFinder.com and LibraryThing.

== See also ==
- List of online booksellers

== Sources ==
- "AbeBooks Fact Sheet". AbeBooks.com. Archived from the original on 2006-03-31.
- Radio interview with Richard Davies of AbeBooks.com on Read First, Ask Later (Ep. 14)
