= Used book =

Book which has been owned before by an owner other than the publisher or retailer

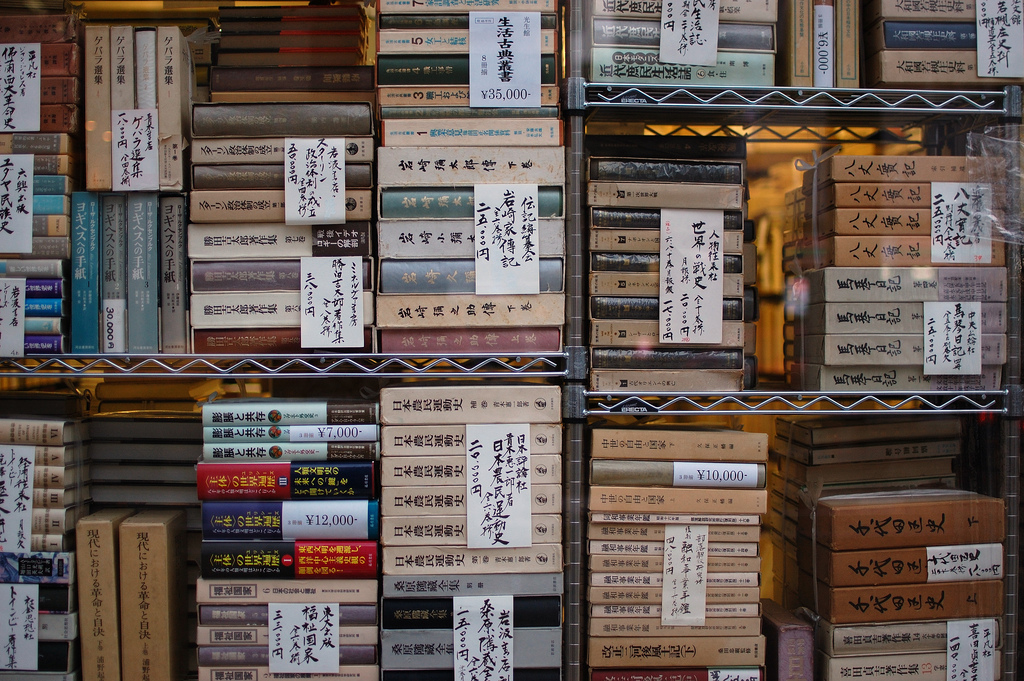
Used books in a bookshop in Japan

A used book or secondhand book is a book which has been owned before by an owner other than the publisher or retailer, usually by an individual or library.

== Sales ==
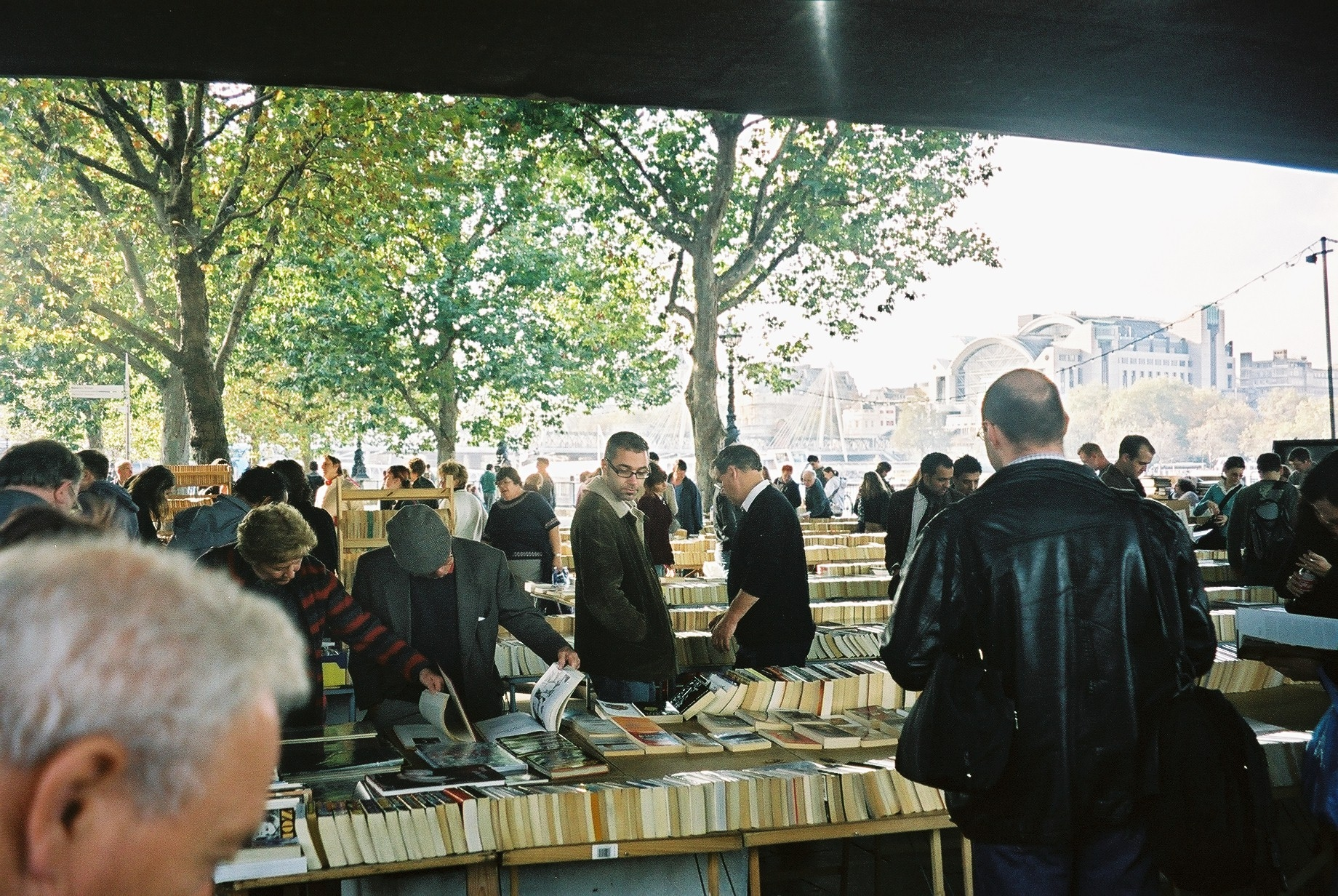
The South Bank Book Market, London, England

Used books typically become available on the market when they are sold or given to a second-hand shop, church used book sale or used bookstore; they are usually sold for about half or three-quarters the price of what they would cost new, though rare books and others still in demand or hard to obtain might sell for more than this.

Book sales in general decreased with the advent of online shopping. However, there are dedicated online retailers for used books that allow individuals to sell directly to them. Some retailers also allow used books to be sold through a third-party marketplace.

Some new book shops also carry used books, and some used book shops also sell new books. Though the original authors or publishers will not benefit financially from the sale of a used book, it helps to keep old books in circulation. Sometimes very old, rare, first edition, antique, or simply out of print books can be found as used books in used book shops.

College textbooks are often bought secondhand. Students will buy secondhand or resell books they bought at full-price to save costs. These copies will be sold through secondhand markets or the school itself.

== Condition ==
A reading copy of a book may be well-used, may include highlighting, marginalia, dedications, and is suitable for reading, but is not collectible. This is a term used in the used book business, to indicate the lack of collectible value, while claiming that the book is in sufficiently good condition for a purchaser whose interest is primarily in actually reading the book. A reading copy is typically less expensive than a collectible copy.

== Booktowns ==
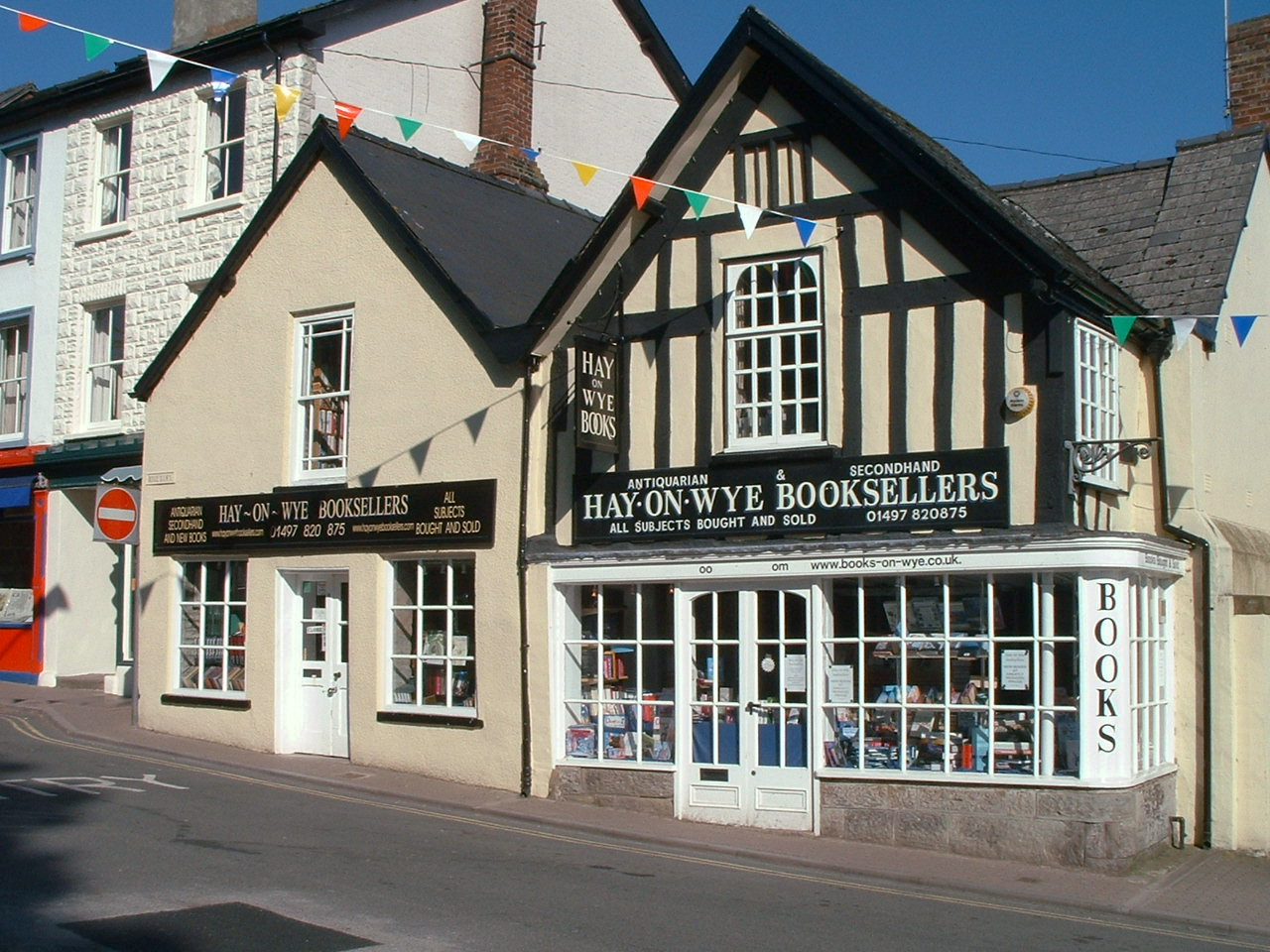
Used bookstore in Hay-on-Wye

A number of small towns have become centres for used book sellers, most notably Hay-on-Wye in South Wales. They act as a magnet for buyers, and are located in country areas of great scenic beauty.

== See also ==
- Bibliophilia
- Bibliomania
- Book swapping
- Bookselling
- Book store shoplifting
- First-sale doctrine
