= Musée Hoangho Paiho =

Natural history museum in Tianjin, China

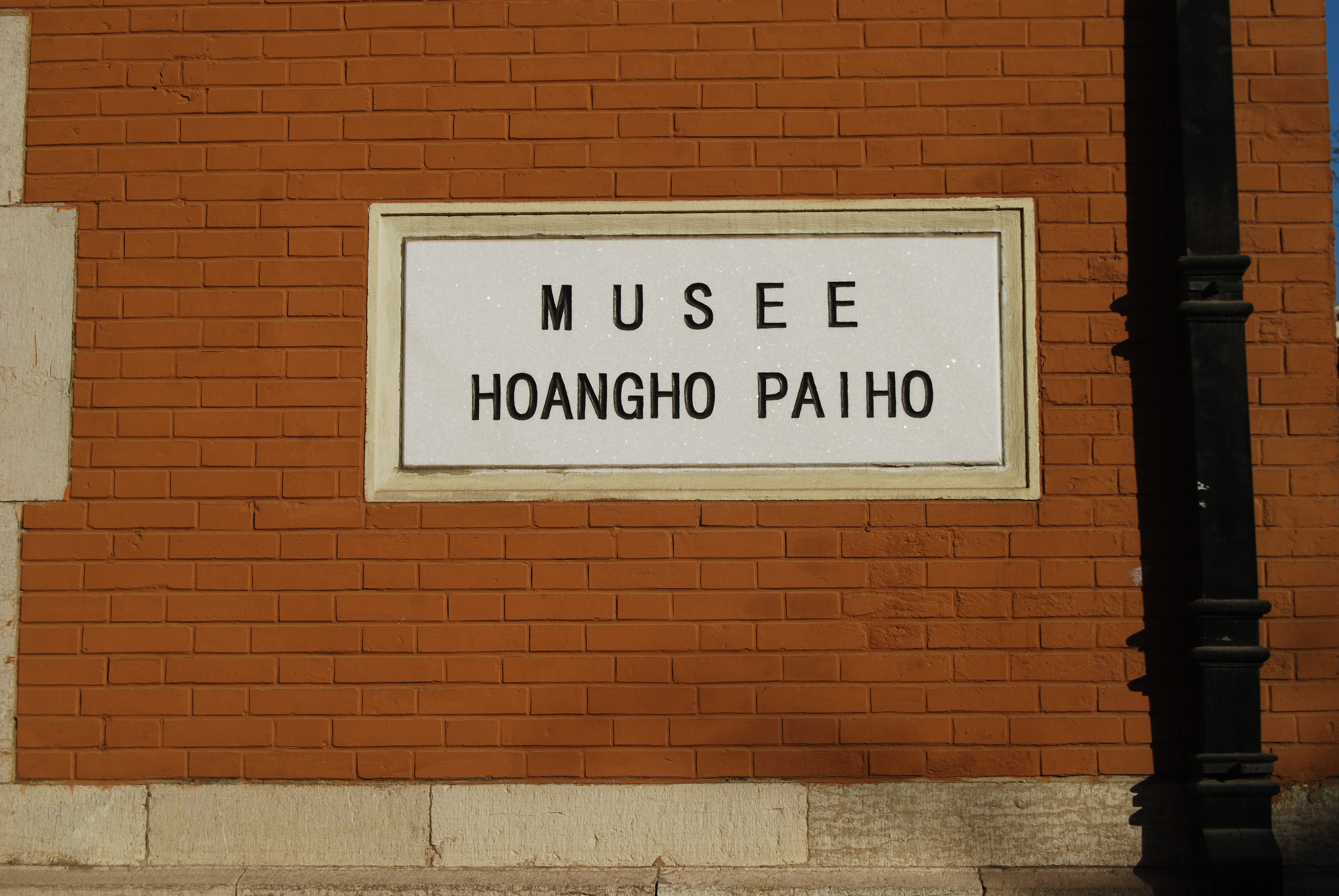

The Musée Hoangho Paiho (Chinese: 黄河白河博物馆; pinyin: Huang He Bai He Bowuguan) was a museum of natural history and fossils founded by the French Jesuit Émile Licent (1876–1952) in Tianjin, China, in 1914. Also known as the Beijiang Museum, it is now part of the Tianjin Natural History Museum.

== History ==
From 1914, under the sponsorship of the Jesuits in Tianjin, Émile Licent collected a large number of specimens and fossils of geology, rocks and minerals, paleontology, flora and fauna, etc. and stored them in the Chongde Hall of the Jesuits in the French Concession in Tianjin. 1922, with the support of the Church and the French Concession in Tianjin, Émile Licent built a special building for the Musée Hoangho Paiho Museum on the land adjacent to the Tsin Ku University, which was founded by the Jesuits in China. The institute hired a number of foreign experts to work, such as Pierre Teilhard de Chardin, and filled the gaps in the field of paleontology in northern China, centered on the Yellow River and Haihe River Basin, and many of the publications and writings were included in the world's database of zoological, botanical, and paleontological literature, which is still an important basis for examining the early scientific records of the various disciplines of biology in northern China. In the 1930s, the Musée Hoangho Paiho Museum and the National Museum of Natural History and other European museums to maintain long-term academic exchanges, in the international community has a certain reputation, until 1937 after the Japanese occupation of Tianjin, the following year, Émile Licent returned to France, the 1940s, the Musée Hoangho Paiho Museum of scientific investigations and research work came to a standstill in a state of retention.

Currently, the Musée Hoangho Paiho Museum is located on the campus of Tianjin Foreign Studies University on Machang Road in Hexi District, Tianjin, and has long been used as the office of Tianjin Natural History Museum and the storage of its collections, which is not open to the public. On January 22, 2016, the Musée Hoangho Paiho Museum was renovated and reopened to the public, and it is considered to be an important object of research for the study of the museums of the early years of China.

The former site of Musée Hoangho Paiho is a Tianjin cultural relics protection unit and a key protection grade historical style building. On October 7, 2019, the former site of Musée Hoangho Paiho was upgraded to the eighth batch of national key cultural relics protection units.

== About the museum ==
The Musée Hoangho Paiho was established by the French Jesuit and natural historian Émile Licent in Tianjin, China, in 1914. The name translates as "Museum of the Yellow River and the White River". It was one of the first museums created in China. It was also known as the Beijiang Museum (Chinese: 北疆博物馆) "Museum of Northern Borderlands"). In 1952, the museum was renamed as the Tianjin Natural History Museum.

The museum is located at 117–119 Machang Avenue, Hexi District, Tianjin, originally in the Institut des Hautes Études et Commerciales (Chinese: 天津工商学院) (now part of Tianjin Foreign Language University). It covers an area of 2000 square meters, consisting of two parts: the museum and the laboratory. The museum part (the northern part) was designed and constructed by the Credit Foncier D’Extreme-Orient in 1922. The laboratory part (the southern part) was constructed by French Yonghe Company between 1925 and 1929. The two parts are connected by an enclosed overpass. The building is three-storied (part of it is two-storied).

The museum was well used by artists in Tianjin, including Liu Kuiliang (1885–1967).

== Publications of the museum ==
The series "Publications du Musée Hoang Ho Pai Ho" was published between 1916 and 1936, and printed at the Imprimerie de la mission catholique at Sienhsien:

- No.12 Listes des sauriens et serpents des collections du Musée Hoang ho Pai ho de Tien Tsin, by P Pavlov 1932)
- No.14. Les collections néolithiques du Musée Hoang ho Pai ho de Tien Tsin, by E. Licent
- No.19. La Collection d'oiseaux du Musée Hoang ho Pai ho de Tien Tsin, by G Seys; Emile Licent (1933)
- No.20. Les poissons des collections ichtyologiques du Musée Hoangho Paiho, by B. Iakovleff (B.P. Jakovlev) (1933)
- No.23 Reptilia and Amphibia collected in 1932 by the staff of the Hoang-ho Pai-ho Tientsin. Publications du Musée Hoang Ho Paiho, by P.A. Pavlov (1933)
- No.25 Brahmaeidae des collections du Musée Hoangho Paiho, by V Strelkov (1933)
- No.26. Collections des Mammifères du Musée Hoang ho Pai ho à Tien Tsin, by B Jakovleff; E de Laberbis (1933)
- No.27. Notes sur les oiseaux observes an Jehol de 1911 a 1932, by G Seys (1933)
- No.28. Collection des mammifères du musée Hoang ho Pai ho de Tien Tsin. Carnivora. III. Fam. Ursidae et Mustelidae / par B.P. Jakovleff,... ; traduit du ms. russe par E. de Laberbis (1934)
- No.30 Bibliographie critique du Musée Hoang ho Pai ho (H.H.P.H.) de Tien Tsin : 1914–1933 by Emile Licent (1934)
- No.31. Additions faites de 1928 à 1933 à la collection d'oiseaux du Musée Hoang ho Pai ho de Tien Tsin, by G Seys; Emile Licent (1934)
- No.34. The non-marine gastropods of north China. Part 1, by T.C. Yen (1935)
- No.38. Hoang Ho-Pai Ho. Comptes-rendus de onze années (1923–1933) de séjour et d'exploration dans le Bassin du Fleuve Jaune, du Pai Ho et des autres tributaires du Golfe du Pei-Tcheu-Ly, by H.I. Harding, Émile Licent (1936)
- No.41. A survey of the amphibia of north China based on the collection by E. Licent S.J. in the Musée Hoangho-Paiho de Tientsin, by Alice M Boring (1936)
- No.42. Notes on some Dytiscidae from Musée Hoang ho Pai ho, Tientsin, with descriptions of eleven new species, by Hsiao-tʻang Fêng (1936)
- No.45 A guide to Hoang ho Pai ho Museum, Race Course Road, Tientsin, by Emile Licent (1937)
- No.51. Annélides Poluchètes du Golfe du Pei Tcheu Ly de la collection du musée Hoang ho Pai ho by Pierre Fauvel (1933)
- Hoang ho-Pai ho. Comptes-rendus de onze années, 1923–1933, de séjour et d'exploration dans le bassin du Fleuve Jaune, du Pai ho et des autres tributaires du Golfe du Pei Tcheu ly, by Émile Licent. [With atlas] (1935–1936)

== See also ==
- Tsin Ku University
