= Tsin Ku University =

Jesuit Catholic university established by the French Jesuits in Tianjin, China

Coordinates: 39.05554478633849°N 117.12428235582182°E

- 津沽大学; Université de Tsin Ku
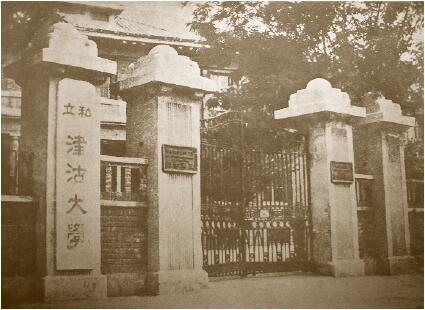
- Gate of Tsin Ku University
- Former names: Institut des Hautes Études Industrielles et Commerciales de Tientsin 天津工商大学（天津工商学院）
- Motto: 实事求是
- Motto in English: Seek truth from facts
- Type: Private University, later converted into a Public University.
- Active: January 1921: Founded as 天津工商大學 (Institut des Hautes Études Industrielles et Commerciales de Tientsin) August 1933: Registered as 私立天津工商學院 (Tientsin Kung Shang College); October 1948: Registered as a university: 私立津沽大學 (Tsin Ku Private University) September 1951: Changed into a public university.–August 1952
- Religious affiliation: Jesuit Catholic
- Location: Tianjin Machang Road, No. 141

Tsin Ku University (Chinese: 津沽大学, French: Université de Tsin Ku) was a Jesuit Catholic university established by the French Jesuits in Tianjin, China. It was the second Catholic university in China and one of the earliest universities in modern China to offer architectural education. Founded in 1921, its official name was originally Institut des Hautes Études Industrielles et Commerciales de Tientsin, translated into Chinese as 天津工商大学. In August 1933, it was officially registered under the Ministry of Education of the Nationalist Government as Private Tientsin Kung Shang College (私立天津工商学院). In October 1948, it was restructured into a university and named Private Tsin Ku University (私立津沽大学). In September 1951, it was converted from private to public and became subordinate to the Ministry of Education. In August 1952, as part of higher education restructuring, Tsin Ku University was dissolved. The engineering college merged into Tianjin University, the school of finance and economics merged into Nankai University, and based on its former campus, the Teacher Training College of Tsin Ku University became Tianjin Teacher Training College, which later evolved into Hebei University. In November 1970, Hebei University relocated to Baoding. Some faculty and students who did not move established Tianjin Foreign Studies Institute on the original Tsin Ku University campus, which has since been upgraded to Tianjin Foreign Studies University.

Currently, Tianjin University (School of Architecture), Nankai University (School of Economics), Nankai University (School of Business), Hebei University, Tianjin Foreign Studies University, and Tianjin University of Finance and Economics all have some lineage or geographical connection to Tsin Ku University. Tianjin Experimental High School also traces its origins to the affiliated high school of this university.

== History ==
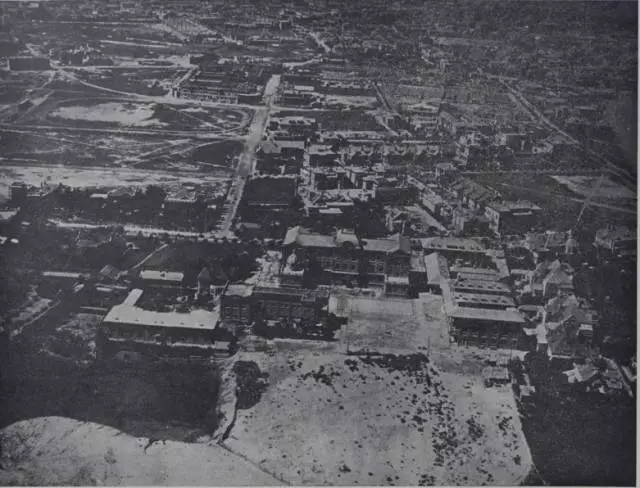
Aerial view of Tianjin University of Commerce

=== Background ===
As early as the 1860s, during the initial period of Tianjin's opening to foreign trade, the French government, seeking to expand its influence in China, intended to establish a higher education institution in Tianjin under the auspices of the Church. Considering the weak presence of the Lazarists in Tianjin, the secretary of the French Legation in China, Louis de Coupigny, instructed the Jesuits to establish a school in Tianjin in 1861, which was met with resistance from the Lazarists. Consequently, the plan was shelved. In 1909, Father Paul-Marie Coquelet of the Xianxian Diocese acquired 100 acres of barren land at the junction of the German Concession and the British Concession on Tianjin, intending to establish a university there. However, the plan was rejected by Li Hongzhang, the then Governor-General of Zhili Province, who was influenced by Britain and America.

After the end of the World War I, the establishment of schools in China was reconsidered. The Holy See learned about the significance of establishing education in China through reports from Bishop Pierre-Marie-Félix Chéron of the Catholic Southeastern Diocese of Zhili and John G. McCormack, the Chinese Inspector of Education. In July 1920, the Holy See instructed Bishop Vincent Lebbe, the newly appointed Bishop of Tianjin, and Bishop Pierre-Marie-Félix Chéron to discuss the establishment of a higher education institution in Tianjin. In December of the same year, an agreement was reached between Bishop Lebbe and Bishop Chéron, "allowing, upon the request of the Superior General of the Jesuits, the establishment of either a university or a vocational school in Tianjin, or the simultaneous establishment of both types of schools". The dispute between the Lazarists and the Jesuits over the right to operate schools lasted for several decades, concluding with the Jesuits obtaining the right. Initially, the Jesuits planned to name the school "Tianjin Agricultural, Industrial, and Commercial University", but it was eventually named "Tianjin University of Commerce".

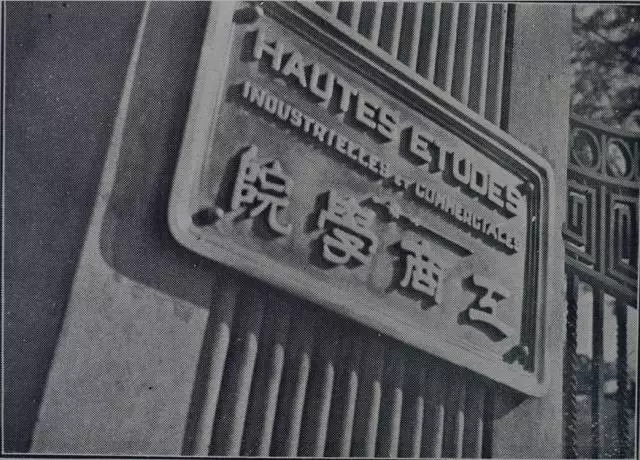
Signboard of Tianjin Institute of Commerce

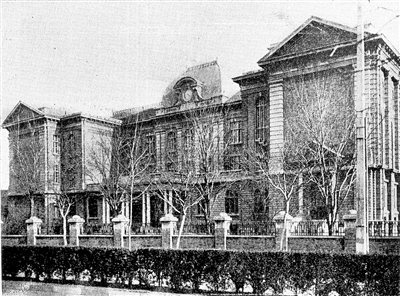
Central building of Tianjin Institute of Commerce in 1937

=== Tianjin University of Commerce ===
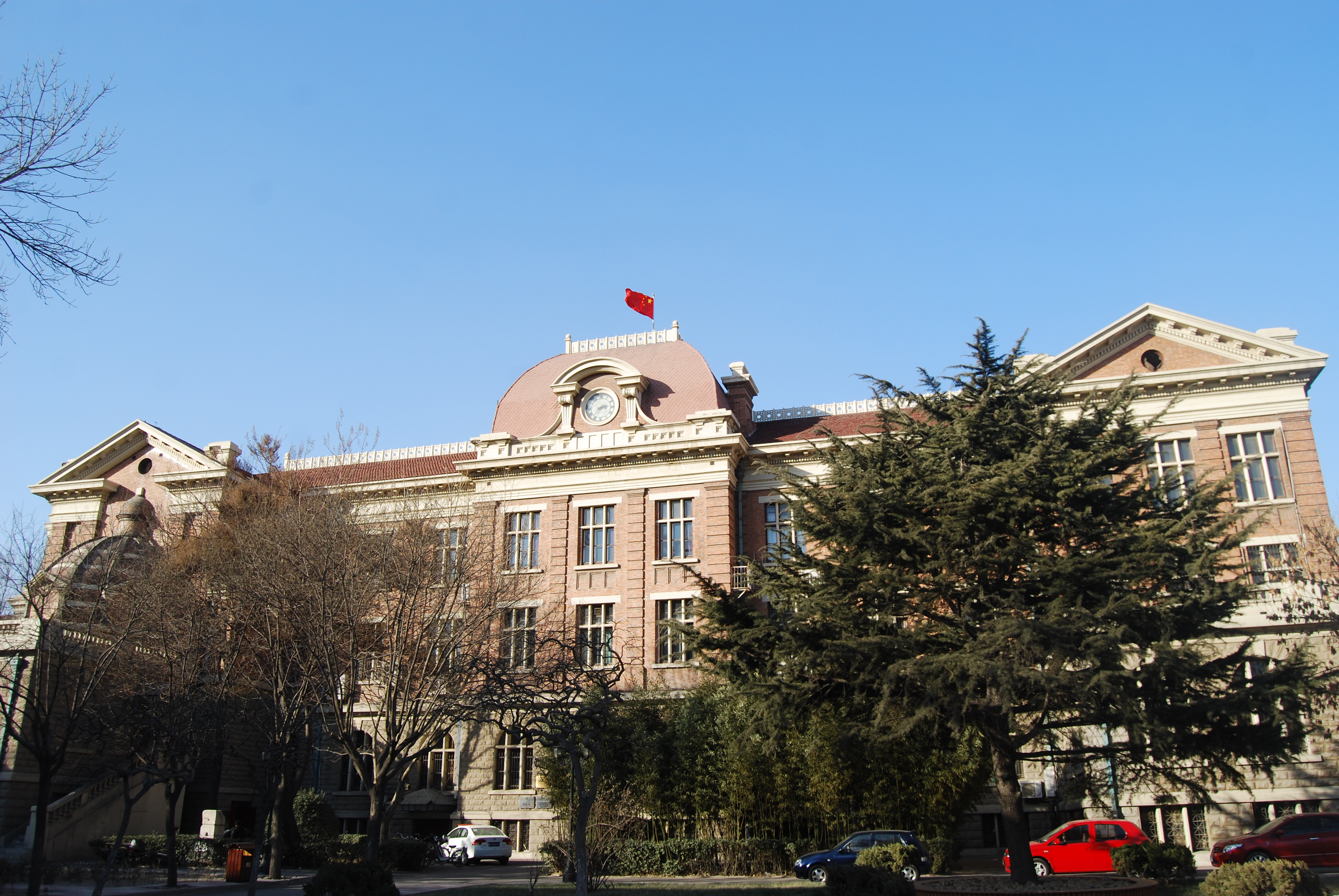
Current state of the former central building of Tianjin Institute of Commerce

On January 14, 1921, the Holy See officially approved Liu Qinming to establish a school in Tianjin. In July, Father Pierre Jubaru was appointed as the first president. In August, Father Jubaru chose the barren land purchased in 1909 (the German Concession) as the site for the school. In October 1922, construction of the teaching building began at the chosen site.

As the focus of the Jesuits in China was secondary education, initially, Tianjin University of Commerce had high school and junior high school departments, namely the Attached High School of Tianjin University of Commerce. However, the establishment of Tianjin University of Commerce expanded the Jesuits' influence in higher education in Tianjin. On April 23, 1922, France's Sang Zhihua established a specialized research institution on the campus of Tianjin University of Commerce, initially named the "Yellow River and White River Museum", later renamed the "Northern Xinjiang Museum" due to the expansion of its collections. In 1923, the preparatory department of Tianjin University of Commerce began enrolling students. In 1925, the main teaching building of Tianjin University of Commerce was completed, commencing formal enrollment with departments for industry and commerce. In July, Father Pierre Pena, a French philosopher with a doctorate from the University of Lille, became the second president of Tianjin University of Commerce. He procured a batch of leading teaching instruments and equipment globally at that time for the school and adopted management methods from European and American universities, recruiting scholars to teach at the school. In 1931, due to illness, Pierre Pena returned to his home country, and a board of directors, predominantly composed of Chinese nationals, was established. Zhao Zhensheng, a Chinese priest, succeeded as the president.

=== Tianjin Institute of Commerce ===
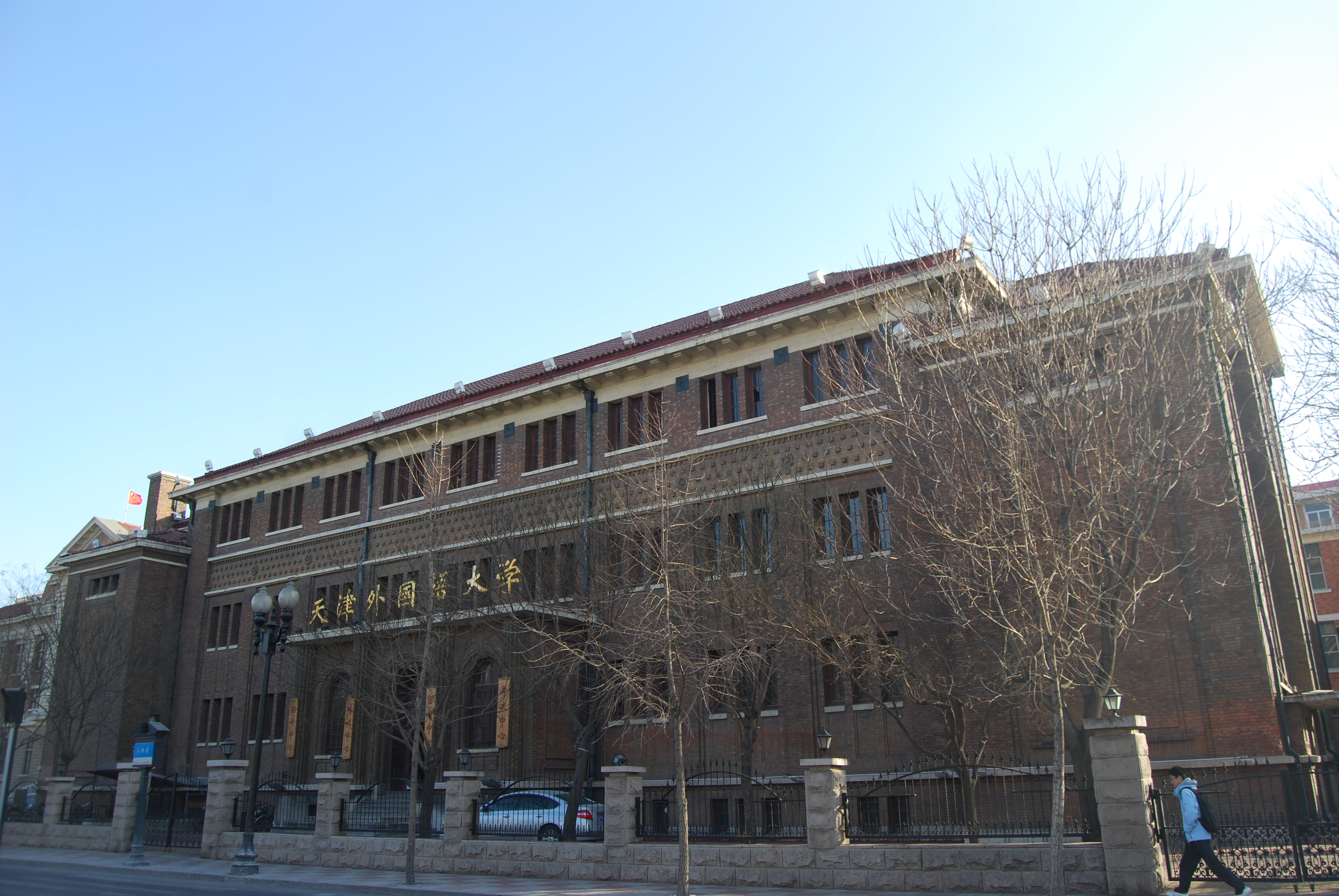
Buildings of Tianjin University of Commerce established in the 1920s

In August 1933, Tianjin University of Commerce was registered with the Ministry of Education of the Nationalist Government. However, as the former departments did not meet the standards of "university" (three colleges and nine departments), the institute was renamed as the Hebei Private Tianjin Institute of Commerce. At the end of 1936, the Suiyuan War broke out, and the students of Tianjin Institute of Commerce organized aid for Suiyuan. In 1937, Tianjin Institute of Commerce changed its engineering department to an engineering college, retaining the Civil Engineering Department and adding the Department of Architecture, with architect Chen Yanzhong appointed as the head of this department. In August 1937, the Japanese occupied Tianjin, and Hua Guanggui had fled to France to avoid persecution by them. The Tianjin Institute of Commerce, due to its affiliation with the Catholic Church and the French government, did not relocate within Tianjin, unlike other universities such as Nankai University and Beiyang University, and continued its operations. It became one of the few colleges to persist in teaching in the occupied areas during the Second Sino-Japanese War. Some students from Zhili and surrounding areas who couldn't relocate applied to Tianjin Institute of Commerce, leading to a sharp increase in the number of enrolled students. By July 1945, the number of enrolled students at Tianjin Institute of Commerce had increased from 141 before the war to 626. In 1943, Tianjin Institute of Commerce established a women's college. On August 13, 1947, during the 34th meeting of the board of directors of the Private Tianjin Institute of Commerce, it was unanimously agreed to change the institution to a university and rename it as Tsin Ku University.

=== Tsin Ku University ===
On October 26, 1948, the Ministry of Education of the Nationalist Government officially approved the upgrade of Tianjin Institute of Commerce to a university. The official document regarding the registration was delivered to the school, and the Hebei Private Tianjin Institute of Commerce was formally upgraded to the Tsin Ku Private University, which was celebrated by the students and professors. After the upgrade to a university, the original teaching traditions and management structure of Tianjin Institute of Commerce were largely retained. However, influenced by the Nationalist Government's admiration for the American university system, there were some changes. The grading system switched to a percentage-based scale, elective courses were introduced, and some full-time faculty members were hired. The ratio of missionaries or religious staff among the teaching staff decreased from around 50% in 1938 to about 10%.

After 1949, the newly ruling government demanded that Tsin Ku Private University offer political courses, which was resisted by the then vice president. The standoff between the two sides led to a period of chaotic teaching, ultimately resolved through the intervention of Tianjin Mayor Huang Jing. However, this incident brought adverse effects to the university, becoming a significant reason for the new government's decision to directly take back control of church-run schools due to their lack of experience in handling such institutions.

In 1951, nationwide adjustments, mergers of higher education institutions, and transformations of private schools began. On April 5, the Tianjin Public Security Bureau arrested the director of the Catholic Jesuit Tianjin Mission, on charges of counter-revolutionary espionage. On July 3, during the seventh meeting of the board of directors of the Tsin Ku Private University, it was decided to request the government to take over the school in the name of the board of directors. Chairman of the board of directors, Li Zhuchen, wrote to the Ministry of Education of the Central People's Government, stating the intention to dedicate Tsin Ku University to the nation and requesting the government to order its transformation into a state-owned institution. On September 19, the Ministry of Education of the Central People's Government issued Order No. 1170 of 1951, approving the transformation of Tsin Ku Private University into a public university under the jurisdiction of the Ministry of Education of the Central People's Government. The Tianjin Daren College merged into the School of Business of Tsin Ku University; Tianjin Civil Engineering School into its School of Engineering and the College of Liberal Arts was transformed into a Teachers' College. In November, the Ministry of Education convened a national conference of deans of engineering colleges to discuss the adjustment plan for engineering colleges, rearranging departments among Tianjin University, Nankai University, and Tsin Ku University. In March 1952, the Tianjin Higher Education Adjustment Committee was established, with Wang Jinding, the vice president and party branch secretary of Tsin Ku University, appointed as the deputy director of the committee. After deliberation, the committee decided to merge Nankai University, Tianjin University, and Tsin Ku University into two institutions: one comprehensive Nankai University and the other a multi-disciplinary industrial Tianjin University, planning to split Tsin Ku University. In August, as part of the adjustment of these higher education institutions, Tsin Ku University was officially dissolved.

=== Dissolution ===
In August 1952, Tsin Ku University was officially dissolved. The School of Engineering of the former Tsin Ku University merged into Tianjin University, specifically the Department of Civil Engineering and the Department of Architectural Engineering merged into Tianjin University's Department of Civil and Architectural Engineering. The College of Finance and Economics of the former Tsin Ku University merged into Nankai University. However, in 1958, the economics and management departments, including trading, management, accounting, finance, fiscal studies, statistics, and others, were separated and formed the independent Hebei College of Finance and Economics, now known as Tianjin University of Finance and Economics.

The former Teachers' College merged with Tianjin Normal University, later restructured into the comprehensive Hebei University. In 1970, Hebei University relocated to Baoding, with only around half of its staff moving. Nearly half remained in Tianjin and joined Tianjin Foreign Studies Institute established in 1974 on the former site of Tsin Ku University, now known as Tianjin Foreign Studies University. The Tsin Ku Affiliated Middle School was renamed Tianjin Normal College Affiliated Middle School, currently Tianjin Experimental School. The original site of the Northern Xinjiang Museum within Tsin Ku University's campus and some of its collections were taken over by Tianjin Cultural Bureau, becoming the "Tianjin People's Museum of Science". In 1958, it was renamed Tianjin Natural History Museum.

In June 1997, the main building of the original Tianjin Institute of Commerce, completed in 1926, was registered as a cultural relic protection unit in Tianjin. In August 2005, the former site of Northern Xinjiang Museum, the main building of the original Tianjin Institute of Commerce, Sang Zhihua's former residence, and other buildings were included in Tianjin's Historical and Cultural Architecture List.

In December 2016, Tianjin Foreign Studies University and Municipal Archives of Tianjin jointly held the "Commemoration of the 95th Anniversary of the Establishment of Tianjin University of Commerce Symposium" and published related books.

== Academic departments ==
Tsin Ku University possessed faculties in both engineering and commerce with a high reputation in the Ping-Jin region and North China. In 1925, Tianjin Institute of Commerce initially offered courses in industry and commerce but a law department was established in 1939, enrolling 18 students; due to financial issues and other reasons, it ceased operations in June 1940. By 1950, Tsin Ku University had three colleges with ten departments. The College of Engineering included the Department of Civil Engineering, Department of Architectural Engineering, and Department of Mechanical Engineering. The College of Business comprised the Department of Accounting and Finance, Department of International Trade, and Department of Business Administration. The College of Liberal Arts consisted of the Department of Chinese Language, Department of Foreign Languages, Department of History and Geography, and Department of Home Economics. After 1950, Tsin Ku University underwent frequent internal restructuring of its departments. Prior to dissolution, the university had the College of Engineering, College of Economics and Finance, and Teachers' College.

=== College of Engineering ===
The most prominent department in Tsin Ku University's College of Engineering was the Department of Architectural Engineering, not only marking the inception of architectural education in Tianjin but also being among the earliest in China to offer such education. Many renowned architectural designs in Tianjin, including various modern structures at Tsinghua University, Tianjin Foreign Concession, and Yaohua High School, were contributed by faculty and students from Tianjin Institute of Commerce.

In 1925, during the first year of Tianjin University of Commerce, the engineering career, specifically Civil Engineering, was established. In 1937, Tianjin Institute of Commerce changed its engineering discipline to the College of Engineering, maintaining the Department of Civil Engineering while founding the Department of Architectural Engineering, pioneering modern architectural education in China. Chen Yanzhong, an architect graduated from the British Architectural Association School, became the first head of the Department of Architectural Engineering. After he died in 1940, architect Shen Liyuan, an alumnus of the University of Naples in Italy, assumed the directorship.

From 1941 to 1944, faculty and students from the Department of Architectural Engineering at Tianjin Institute of Commerce participated in the surveying and mapping of the central axis of the Forbidden City, as well as the Temple of Heaven and Temple of Agriculture among other ancient architectural structures.

On December 1, 1945, the board of directors of the Institute of Commerce resolved to establish the Department of Mechanical Engineering in the College of Engineering.

In August 1952, after the dissolution of Tsin Ku University, the former College of Engineering merged into Tianjin University, specifically the Department of Civil Engineering and Department of Architectural Engineering were incorporated into Tianjin University's Department of Civil and Architectural Engineering.

=== College of Economics and Finance ===
In 1925, the commerce career was established during the first year of Tianjin University of Commerce. In 1937, this career was divided into two departments: Accounting and Finance, and International Trade, gradually evolving into the College of Business. On December 1, 1945, the board of directors of the Institute of Commerce resolved to establish the Department of Business Administration within the College of Business. In October 1950, the Department of Business Administration was renamed the Department of Enterprise Management. In June 1951, the College of Business became the College of Economics and Finance, renaming the Department of Accounting and Finance to the Department of Accounting, and International Trade to the Department of Trade.

In August 1952, after the dissolution of Tsin Ku University, the former College of Economics and Finance merged into Nankai University. In 1958, the foundation of Hebei College of Finance and Economics was established based on economics programs from Nankai University (including trade, enterprise management, accounting, finance, fiscal studies, statistics, etc.), presently known as Tianjin University of Finance and Economics.

=== Teachers' College ===
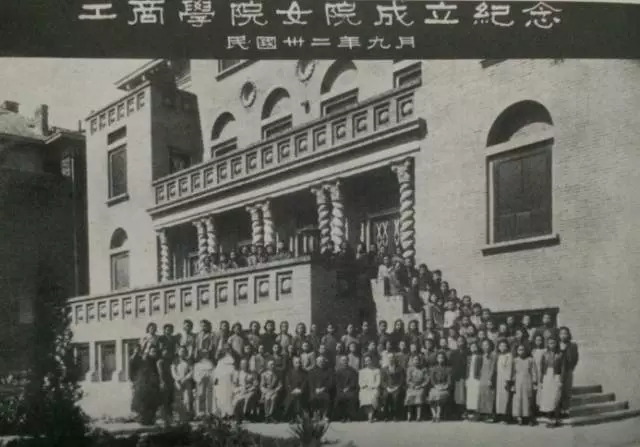
The predecessor of Tsin Ku University Teachers' College, the founding memorial of Tianjin Institute of Commerce Women's College

The Teachers' College was the most recently established and shortest-lived college among the three colleges of Tsin Ku University. There are contrary statements regarding the establishment time of the Women's College or the Women's Literature Department, the precursor of the Teachers' College. According to one assertion, the Women's Literature Department was established in 1939 alongside the Tianjin Institute of Commerce. Another claim suggests the establishment of the Women's Literature Department in 1943. Additionally, in September 1943, Tianjin Institute of Commerce established the Women's College exclusively for female students initially without divisions, under the leadership of modern female educator Sun Jiayu, aiming to address the deficiency in higher education for women. Later, it was divided into the Department of Home Economics and the Department of History and Geography.

In September 1945, the Women's College was renamed the Faculty of Arts, adding the Chinese Literature Department. In August 1946, the Faculty of Arts included the Department of Foreign Languages, with plans to establish an Education Department, which was never realized due to inadequate funding. There's another report mentioning that in November 1948, after being renamed Tsin Ku Private University, the Literature Department was further subdivided into the Chinese Language Department and the Foreign Language Department.

In 1951, the Faculty of Arts was transformed into the Teachers' College. The original Tsin Ku University Teachers' College merged with Tianjin Teachers' College for Further Studies, forming Tianjin Normal University, later restructured into the comprehensive Hebei University, relocating from Tianjin to Baoding. Some faculty and staff did not relocate and joined the establishment of Tianjin Foreign Studies College at the former site of Tsin Ku University.

== Educational practices ==
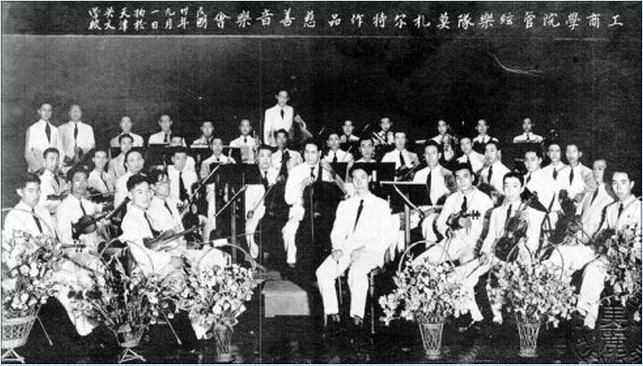
Tianjin Institute of Commerce Orchestra

In the early 20th century, there was considerable development in public and private universities in China. Comparatively, while universities like Beiyang University and Nankai University primarily followed the American education system, Tsin Ku University, established by the French Catholic Church, adhered to the French education system from its inception. Regarding admissions, during the period of Tianjin Institute of Commerce, the school held annual admissions exams during the summer vacation in Tianjin, Beiping (now Beijing), and Jinan, targeting high school graduates as the entry criterion. The entrance exams for engineering comprised 12 subjects, including Chinese language, English (written and oral), geometry, and higher algebra, while commerce exams involved eight subjects including Chinese language, English (written and oral), geometry, and algebra.

In terms of teaching, Tsin Ku University adopted a balanced approach between theory and practice, focusing on cultivating students' diligence, judgment, calculation, and creative habits, resulting in extensive scientific and practical activities among students. The curriculum for engineering included courses such as physics, chemistry, mathematics, mechanics, surveying, geology, hydrology, civil engineering, materials, among others, while commerce courses covered chemistry, business studies, insurance, accounting, economics, finance, statistics, customs, banking, international trade, and more.

Regarding practical training, Tsin Ku University students participated in internships, industrial and mining bank visits, and field surveys. Engineering students would undertake specialized internships during the summer in places like Beiping, Qingdao, and Tianjin, and also visited industrial and mining enterprises and banking institutions. Before graduating, fourth-year students participated in field trips, such as in 1945 when they interned at Tanggu Yongli Alkali Plant and Jiu Da Salt Factory.

Tsin Ku University fostered a cultural and athletic atmosphere, hosting teams for tennis, basketball, and volleyball. At the Tianjin City Games in 1936, students from Tianjin Institute of Commerce secured championships in high hurdles, middle hurdles, long jump, and high jump. In 1941, the Tianjin Institute of Commerce Orchestra was established, becoming one of the most active orchestras in Tianjin at that time. Conducted by Zhang Xiaohu, it held charitable Mozart music concerts at venues like Daguangming Cinema and Tianjin English School, as well as organizing "Tianjin Institute of Commerce Fundraising Music Concert" at Yaohua School Auditorium.

== Faculty ==
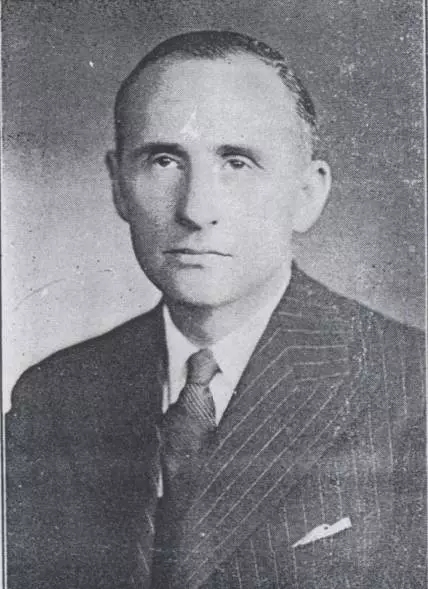
Professor Paul Müller at Tianjin Institute of Commerce

Tsin Ku University, being one of the earliest modern universities in China to commence architectural education, had many famous modern Chinese architects such as Chen Yanzhong, Yan Ziheng, Zhang Bi, Feng Jiankui, and foreign architects like Paul Müller from France, and Rolf Geyling from Austria. Numerous architects graduated from Tsin Ku University, including Yu Fujing, Huang Tingjue, among others. During the Sino-Japanese War, scholars who couldn't relocate, such as Qi Sihe, Weng Dujian and Hou Renzhi from Yenching University, Yuan Xianneng, Hu Jiyuan, Zhang Hualun from Nankai University, technical experts in engineering like architects Yan Ziheng, Tan Zhen, Shen Liyuan, Liu Wenkai, hydraulics experts Wang Huatang, Gao Jingying, Sun Jiaqi, all taught at Tianjin Institute of Commerce. Consequently, the chaotic situation in North China during the war against Japan and the relationship with France objectively strengthened the teaching faculty of Tianjin Institute of Commerce. In 1943, following the return of Tianjin's French Concession to China, several French professors, including Paul Muret, left Tianjin or China. After 1949, foreign professors and priests voluntarily left China. Some individuals, like vice president and French priest Paul Bourquin, were dismissed, arrested, or expelled.

== University symbols ==
=== Motto ===
Since the period of Tianjin Institute of Commerce, Tsin Ku University has upheld the motto "Seek truth from facts" (Chinese: 实事求是). After its dissolution, Hebei University, Tianjin Foreign Studies University, and Tianjin Experimental High School, which have inherited the educational legacy of Tsin Ku University, have continued and evolved this motto. Hebei University's motto is "Seek truth from facts, study earnestly and act sincerely" (Chinese: 实事求是，笃学诚行), while Tianjin Foreign Studies University's motto is "Seeking knowledge both at home and abroad, striving for virtue and progress" (Chinese: 中外求索，德业竞进). The Tianjin Experimental High School, formerly affiliated with the original Tsin Ku University, retained the motto "Seek truth from facts", summarizing it as their educational spirit: "Seek truth from facts, contemplate, and innovate" (Chinese: 实事求是，思学思新).

== Campus buildings ==
Former site of the main building of Tianjin Institute of Commerce, 1924
- 天津工商学院主楼旧址
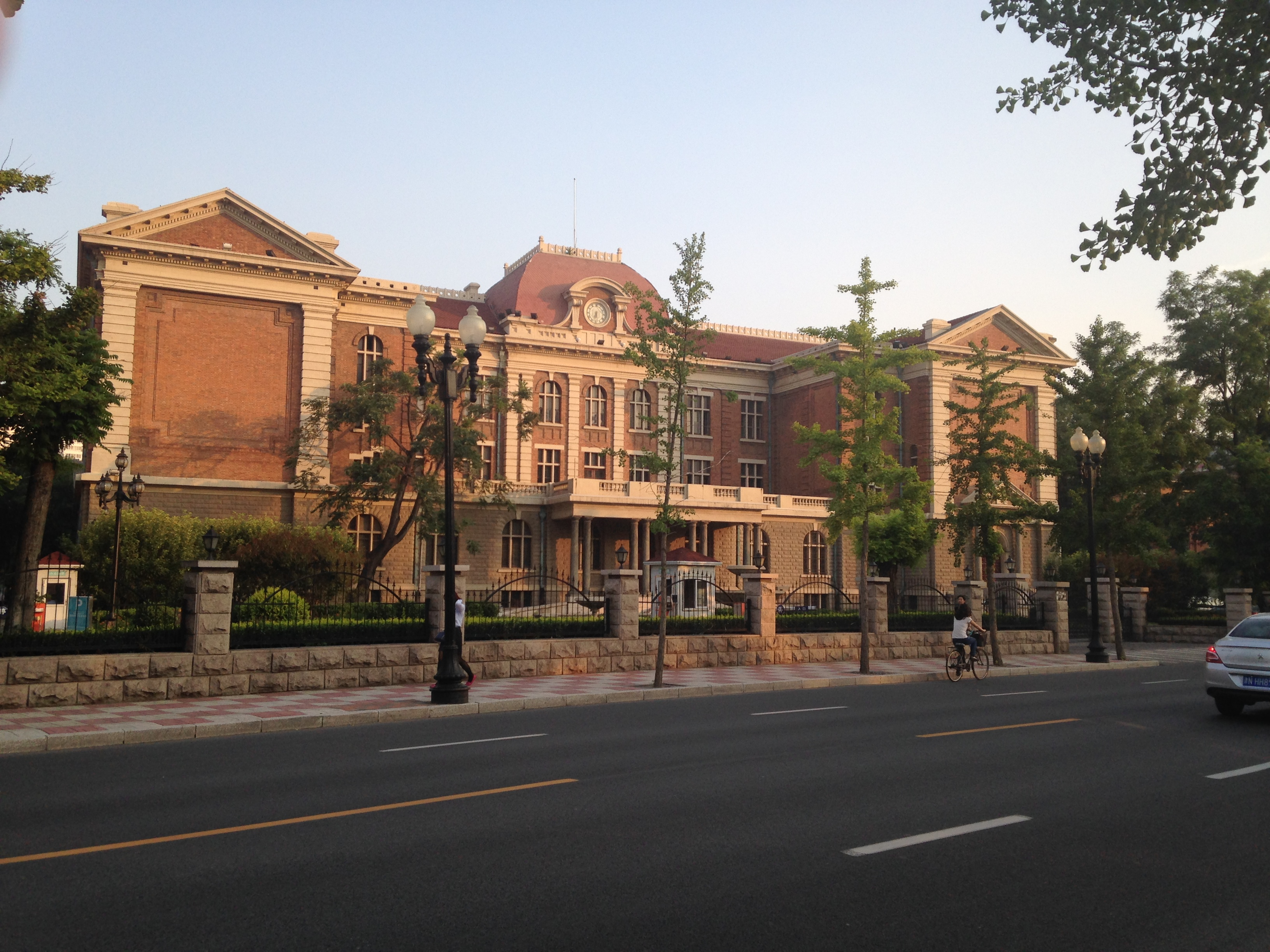
- Significant historical site and representative modern building. Registered on May 3, 2013 (n. 7-1630)
- Interactive map of the Former site of the main building of Tianjin Institute of Commerce, 1924 area

General information
- Location: Hexi district, Tianjin

Design and construction
- Awards: Major Historical and Cultural Site Protected at the National Level

Tsin Ku University is situated near the boundary of the British concession of Tianjin, retaining the campus site from when it was established as Tianjin Institute of Commerce. The architectural style of Tsin Ku University's campus, similar to other buildings in the concession, adopted the prevalent European classical style of the time, such as the Renaissance-style classical religious buildings or the Second French Empire style. The original location of the Beijiang Museum and the former residence of its founder, Sang Zhihua, were also established on the vacant land purchased by the Catholic Church, adjacent to the school. With the development of the school, the Beijiang Museum integrated into the school's architecture, forming a layout structure within the school, even being mistakenly regarded as a research institution affiliated with the school.

=== Central building ===
Among Tsin Ku University's buildings, the most recognized is the Central Building, also known as the undergraduate building or the main teaching building. Designed by the on-campus architect, Paul Müller, a professor from the French Commercial Yunghe Engineering Bureau. Its construction began in 1924, and it was completed and put into use in 1926. Covering a total floor area of 4,917 square meters, this building has been the primary venue for undergraduate-level teaching since its completion, and the overall architecture is considered a replica of French classical architecture.

The Central Building adopts the typical structure of Western church architecture: a regular rectangular plan, with a narrow and tall central space flanked by symmetrical forms on both sides. The building is centered around the main hall facing Machang street, with staircases and classrooms on either side, supported by four groups of Tuscan columns at the lower platform of the hall. The roof of the building is adorned with luxurious French mansard roofing, covered with fish-scale tiles. The windows on the ground floor are in the form of arches, while those on the second and third floors are rectangular. The basement and ground floor exterior walls of the building are built with concrete resembling stone blocks, while the upper floors are constructed with large red bricks. The halls, lobbies, and interior corridors of the building feature arched doorways, and the floors are adorned with various artistic patterns created from colored mosaic tiles.

=== Architecture preservation and heritage ===
Following the dissolution of Tsin Ku University, the campus buildings were subsequently used by Tianjin Normal University, established with the participation of the former Tsin Ku University Teachers College. Later, it was used by the Tianjin Foreign Studies University. In August 1991, the former site of the Beijiang Museum located within the campus was registered as a cultural site unit in Tianjin. In June 1997, the Central Building of Tsin Ku University was included in Tianjin's cultural relic protection units, registered under the name "Former main building of the Institute of Commerce". In 2004, the Tianjin Municipal Government funded the restoration of the Central Building of Tsin Ku University (Institute of Commerce) following the principle of "repairing old features," which included replacing corroded building components. In August 2005, this building and its associated structures were listed as Tianjin's historical and architectural landmarks. In 2011, the Tianjin Urban Planning Bureau announced the historical and cultural district protection plan, including the original site of Tsin Ku University in the Wuda Street Historical and Cultural District. In May 2013, this building was recognized as a significant historical site and representative modern building, designated by the State Council as the "Former site of the main building of the Tianjin Institute of Commerce". Presently, the architectural complex left by Tsin Ku University has become an integral part of the Tianjin Wudad Street tourist area.

== Relation with the Church and the French government ==
The establishment of Tianjin Institute of Commerce aimed to assist in Catholic missionary work and attract intellectuals and important groups in China. Additionally, the French government hoped to gain more concession land in Tianjin by selecting the school's location. The funds for the school's establishment were provided by the Catholic Church, which had purchased the land for the campus more than ten years before its establishment, and the first president in charge of its establishment was Father Yu Puze, selected by the church.

During the early stages of its establishment, Tianjin Institute of Commerce had a considerable number of staff and faculty who were either foreign nationals or Catholics. Consequently, the initially established Tianjin Institute of Commerce was a typical church school internally referred to as the "Tianjin Sacred Heart College." However, unlike the developmental path of other church universities that evolved from initially established primary and secondary schools, Tsin Ku University was among the earliest to provide higher education. Initially, the funding sources for Tianjin Institute of Commerce mainly included subsidies from the Vatican and missionary funds allocated by the Jesuits in the region. However, unlike many graduates of other church universities who pursued missionary work or teaching within the church, a significant proportion of Tsin Ku University's graduates engaged in commerce and business after graduation, with only a very small percentage becoming priests or teachers within the church (some sources suggest less than five percent, while others claim it was nearly one-tenth of the total registered students). As the scale of the institution expanded and funding sources diversified, both Tianjin Institute of Commerce and Shandong University hoped to receive financial assistance from the French government. Simultaneously, the French government acknowledged the necessity of cooperation with the church and provided financial aid to the schools, resulting in increased reliance on French support, leading to a more French-influenced educational system than a distinctly Catholic one.

After 1949, differences arose between the new government and the French priest, vice president at the time, Father Bu Xiangxian, regarding the introduction of political classes. This disagreement became a significant reason for the new government, which lacked experience in handling church schools, to directly reclaim control over these institutions. In 1951, against the backdrop of rising nationalism, individuals of foreign missionary backgrounds like Bu Xiangxian were dismissed from their positions.

== Preparatory School and Affiliated Middle School ==
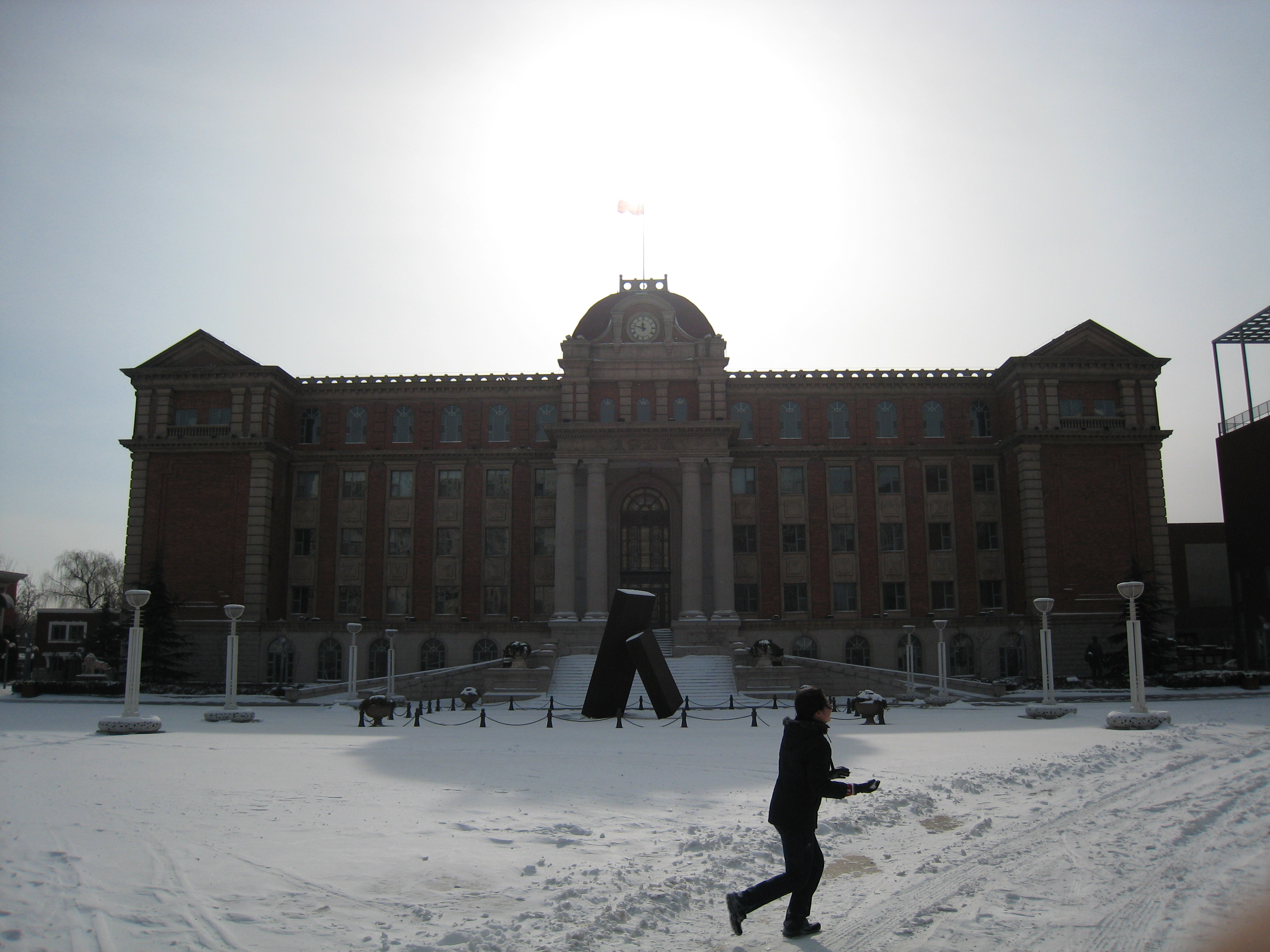
The prototype of the Yifu Science Building at Tianjin Experimental High School is the Central Building of Tsin Ku University.

In 1923, Tianjin Institute of Commerce established a preparatory school. By the decree of the Nationalist Government's Ministry of Education in 1931, the preparatory school was transformed into the Affiliated Senior High School of Tianjin Institute of Commerce, abbreviated as "Gongshang Fuzhong," which also included a junior high school department, with Yong Jujing appointed as its principal. In 1933, Tianjin Institute of Commerce was officially registered by the Ministry of Education and renamed Tianjin Institute of Commerce. During the same year, the high school department of the affiliated middle school was registered. By 1936, the junior high school department was also officially registered. In 1948, Tianjin Institute of Commerce was upgraded to Tsin Ku University, and the affiliated middle school was renamed Tsin Ku University Affiliated Middle School. In August 1952, following the dissolution of Tsin Ku University, the Tsin Ku University Affiliated Middle School came under the administration of the Tianjin Education Bureau and is now Tianjin Experimental High School, a key school directly under the Tianjin Municipal Education Commission, retaining the motto of Tsin Ku University: "Seek Truth from Facts".

== Beijiang Museum ==
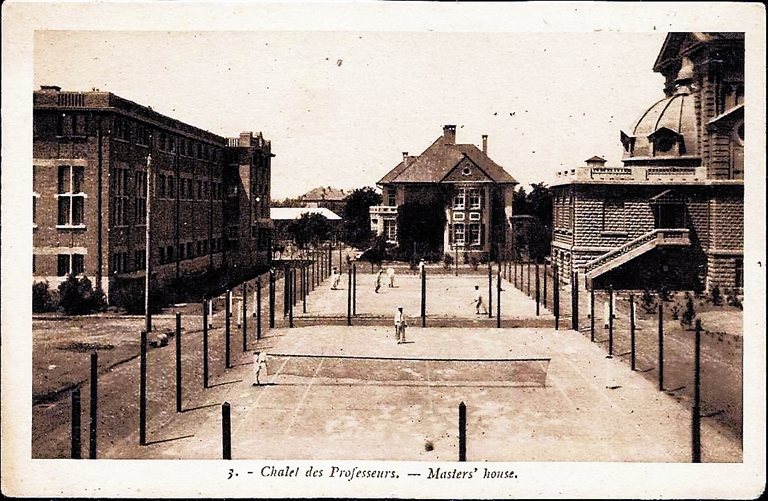
Beijiang Museum and Tianjin Institute of Commerce

The Beijiang Museum was one of the earliest museums established in northern China and one of the country's oldest museums overall. In 1922, under the sponsorship of the Tianjin Jesuits, French missionary Father Henri Sancier began constructing the museum on land belonging to the church adjacent to the Tianjin Institute of Commerce campus in the British concession in Tianjin. Initially named "MUSEE HOANGHO PAIHO" or "Yellow River and White River Museum", it was later renamed Beijiang Museum due to the expansion of its collections.

The museum held significant importance in China's paleontology, geology, archaeology, and museum circles. Opinions on the relationship between Beijiang Museum and Tsin Ku University vary among scholars. Some assert that the museum was affiliated with or associated with Tsin Ku University, while others suggest they existed as parallel entities without any direct affiliation. Subsequent investigations indicated that both Beijiang Museum and Tsin Ku University were under the Catholic Jesuits, yet they operated independently. However, they were institutions that complemented each other. The research and exhibitions at Beijiang Museum provided a channel for Tsin Ku University's natural science practices and broadened its horizons, while Tsin Ku University offered an excellent research environment for Beijiang Museum.

== List of presidents ==
On July 21, 1921, Yu Puze was appointed as the president responsible for organizing the school's establishment. On July 25, he arrived in Tianjin and selected the empty space near the Church of Machang Street as the school's location, commencing the construction of the campus. In July 1925, Father Henri Bernard succeeded as president.

In June 1931, as Tianjin Institute of Commerce prepared to be registered, the school established a majority-Chinese Board of Directors and appointed Father Zhao Zhensheng as the principal.

In August 1933, Hua Nangui took on the role of president at Tianjin Institute of Commerce. In August 1937, following the Japanese occupation of Tianjin, Hua Nangui fled to France, and Liu Bin acted as the acting president. In July 1943, the board of directors appointed Liu Nairen as the president.

In June 1949, Wang Junde became the president of Tsin Ku University. After Tsin Ku University was turned into a public institution in 1951, Zhang Guofan, former Dean of Beiyang University, served as the president of Tsin Ku University until its dissolution and was later transferred back to Tianjin University as the vice president.

== Alumni ==
Alumni of Tsin Ku University refer to individuals who studied, worked, pursued further education, or held full-time or part-time teaching positions at Tianjin Institute of Commerce, Tianjin Business School, and Tsin Ku University. Since 1925, when Tsin Ku University started admitting undergraduate students, the number of enrolled students has gradually increased. Until 1950, the school had maintained a positive growth trend. Over the span of 25 years, a total of 1,184 undergraduate students graduated from the university.

Among the alumni who were also faculty members, there were numerous renowned modern Chinese architects such as Chen Yanzhong, Yan Ziheng, Zhang Bo, Tan Zhen, Shen Liyuan, Liu Wenkai, as well as foreign architects like Paul Müller and Rolf Geyling. It also included experts in water conservancy such as Wang Huatang, Gao Jingying, and Sun Jiaqi. During the Resistance War against Japan, scholars who couldn't relocate, such as Qi Sihe, Weng Dujian, Hou Renzhi from Yanjing University, Yuan Xianneng, Hu Jiyuan, Zhang Hualun from Nankai University, all taught at Tianjin Institute of Commerce. Because Tsin Ku University was one of the earliest modern schools to offer architectural education in China, it produced numerous architects, among them Yu Fujing.

In 1928, physicist Yuan Jialiu was admitted to the School of Engineering at Tianjin Institute of Commerce. In 1931, accounting expert Professor Li Baozhen joined Tianjin Institute of Commerce in the commerce department, and after graduating, stayed on as a teacher, subsequently becoming a professor, head of the Department of Accounting and Finance, and vice president.

Additionally, notable alumni from Tsin Ku University include Yao Yilin, a member of the 13th Central Committee of the Chinese Communist Party and former Vice Premier of the State Council.

== Legacy ==
As Tsin Ku University went through three main periods—Tianjin Institute of Commerce, Tianjin Business School, and Tsin Ku University— and experienced different social states like wars and revolutions, and faced complex departmental restructuring after dissolution, documents and archives from various periods of Tsin Ku University's history have been preserved as crucial historical archival materials in libraries and archives both domestically and internationally. However, richer archival materials pertaining to the school's heritage are found in Hebei University, Tianjin Foreign Studies University, Nankai University, Municipal Archives of Tianjin, among others. These documents can be found in different languages.

In October 2004, Wang Zhenming, former vice president of Nankai University, donated the "Signature Account of the Celebration of Tsin Ku University's Transition to National Reception and the Opening Ceremony for New Students" which he had preserved for many years to the Tianjin Municipal Archives. In October 2010, a monograph titled "In the Sunshine of Jugu"—Tianjin Institute of Commerce, Tianjin Business School" edited by Yan Yutian from Hebei University and published by People's Publishing House, documented the history of Tianjin Institute of Commerce, Tianjin Business School, and Tsin Ku University, deriving its title from Tianjin Institute of Commerce's school anthem.

In December 2016, Tianjin Foreign Studies University and Tianjin Municipal Archives jointly organized a "Commemoration of the 95th Anniversary of Tianjin Institute of Commerce" seminar and published the book "Selected Archives of Tianjin Institute of Commerce (Tsin Ku University)" to commemorate the occasion.

== See also ==
- Tianjin Foreign Studies University
- Musée Hoangho Paiho
- Hebei University
