= Imprimerie de la mission catholique (Sienhsien) =

The Imprimerie de la mission catholique, Sienhsien was a significant printing press established by Jesuit fathers in Sienhsien (献县, Xianxian), China, in 1874.

== About the press ==
The Imprimerie was created to publish devotional materials and sinological works. These volumes were studied widely by the foreign communities in China, and reprinted in several editions over subsequent decades. It also printed paper money (there are four examples, signed by Eugene Kammerer, in the British Museum collection, with photographs of the printing establishment).

== Publications published or printed by the press ==
The Imprimerie printed publications for several organisations, including the Musée Hoangho Paiho. The publisher name and address printed on many of its publications were: Mission de Sien Hsien, Race Course Road, Tien Tsin.

- 1896 Dictionnaire classique de la langue chinoise, by Séraphin Couvreur
- 1896 Che King, texte chinois avec une double traduction en français et en latin, by Seraphin Couvreur (1896; 3rd ed. 1934)
- 1905 Caractères. [Lexiques], by Léon Wieger
- 1906 Textes philosophiques, by Léon Wieger
- 1909 Folk-lore chinois moderne, by Léon Wieger
- 1909 Catéchèses à l'usage des néo-missionnaires, by Léon Wieger
- 1914 Vocabulaire français-chinois des sciences, by Charles Taranzano
- 1919 Études de chinois. III, Dialogues : langue mandarine, by A. Gasperment
- 1920 Etudes de chinois. II, mélanges: langue mandarine
- 1920 Etudes de chinois. IV, récits : langue mandarine, by A. Gasperment
- 1921 Chine moderne. Tome 2, Le flot montant by Léon Wieger
- 1922 Chinois écrit. Précis. : grammaire, phraséologie, by Léon Wieger
- 1923 Supplément français-chinois des sciences, by Charles Taranzano
- 1924 La Chine à travers les âges : Précis. Index biographique. Index bibliographique
- 1925 Etudes de chinois. I, grammaire : langue mandarine, by A. Gasperment (3rd ed.)
- 1925 Etudes de chinois. III, dialogues : langue mandarine, by A. Gasperment (2nd ed.)
- 1926 Etudes de chinois. II, mélanges : langue mandarine, by A. Gasperment
- 1927 Histoire des croyances religieuses et des opinions philosophiques en Chine depuis l'origine, jusqu'à nos jours, by Léon Wieger
- 1928 Le révérend père Joseph Gonnet de la Compagnie de Jésus, by Émile Becker, peÌre
- 1929 Textes historiques : Histoire politique de la Chine depuis l'origine, jusqu'en 1929, by Léon Wieger
- 1930 Les Quatre Livres, by Séraphin Couvreur (3rd ed.)
- 1931 Code foncier de la République de Chine
- 1931 Code civil de la république de Chine. Livre IV: De la famille et livre V: De la succession, et lois d'application de ces deux livres (Series: Le droit chinois moderne, no. 10)
- 1932 Les collections néolithiques du Musée Hoang ho Pai ho de Tien Tsin, by E. Licent (Series: Publications du Musée Hoang-ho Pai-ho, no. 14)
- Reptiles and Amphibia collected in 1932 by the staff of the Hoang ho Pai ho Museum, by P. A. Pavlov (Series Publications du Musée Hoang-ho Pai-ho, no. 23)
- 1936 Hoang Ho-Pai Ho. Comptes-rendus de onze années (1923–1933) de séjour et d'exploration dans le Bassin du Fleuve Jaune, du Pai Ho et des autres tributaires du Golfe du Pei-Tcheu-Ly, by H.I. Harding, Émile Licent S.J. (Series: Publications du Musée Hoang-ho Pai-ho, no. 38)
- 1936 A survey of the amphibia of north China based on the collection by E. Licent S.J. in the Musée Hoangho-Paiho de Tientsin, by Alice M Boring (Series: Publications du Musée Hoang-ho Pai-ho, no. 41)
- 1936 Notes on some Dytiscidae from Musée Hoang ho Pai ho, Tientsin, with descriptions of eleven new species, by Hsiao-tʻang Fêng (Series: Publications du Musée Hoang-ho Pai-ho, no. 42)
- 1936 New remains of Postschizotherium from s.e. Shansi, by Pierre Teilhard de Chardin; Emile Licent
- 1937 Le Père Matthieu Ricci et la société chinoise de son temps (1552-1610), by Henri Bernard
- 1937 Psychologia speculativa : ad usum privatum, by F. Resch
- 1942 Théorie des belles-lettres : résumé, by Georges Longhaye, (S.I.)
- 1948 Études de chinois. V, lexique = Fen lei ci dian : mots groupés par idées, by A. Gasperment

== See also ==
- Jesuit China missions
