= Tianjin University of Finance and Economics =

Higher Education Institution in China

- 天津财经大学
- Type: Public
- Established: 1958
- President: Li Weian (李维安)
- Academic staff: 1,645
- Students: around 12,000
- Undergraduates: 10,000
- Postgraduates: 2,000
- Location: Hexi, Tianjin, China; 39.060°N 117.273°E
- Campus: two campuses, urban
- Website: www.tjufe.edu.cn

The Tianjin University of Finance and Economics (Chinese: 天津财经大学; TUFE) is a public university in Tianjin, China. The university was founded in 1958 and is one of the earliest offering applied economics and business administration in China.

== History ==
In the early years of TUFE, the school was greatly contributed by faculty of the business school of Nankai University and other professors in north China. This was due to the readjustment of the national education system after the foundation of the PRC. The university is under the municipal government of Tianjin on 1 October 1969.

== Organization ==
Now there are over 11,000 undergraduate and 1,300 graduate students on campus. There are 117 professors, 226 assistant professors in the university. A comprehensive educational system has been formed with levels from doctorate to bachelor programs in economics, business, management, law, science and engineering, education, literature and art. TUFE offers bachelor's and master's degrees in 33 areas and doctorates in statistics, accounting and finance. It is one of the universities permitted by the Ministry of Education to offer MBA programs, and among the first batch of universities authorized by the Academic Degree Committee of the State Council as early as 1987 to conduct educational programs with foreign universities and confer academic degrees of foreign countries. It is also one of the universities that offer the courses of Chinese Certified Public Accountants (CPA). The university has one of the exam center of Association of Chartered Certified Accountants (ACCA); there are test centers for both the "Chartered Association of Certified Accountants" (ACCA) of Great Britain and "Cambridge English Certificate".

Forty majors are offered, which can be classified into the following seven categories: economics, management, science, law, humanities, pedagogics and engineering. A comprehensive educational system has been formed which entails the enrollment of all sorts of students, namely, candidates working for the doctorate, master, bachelor and associate degrees as well as adult trainees and oversea students. There are 12 schools and departments, such as International Economics and trade, Banking, Accounting, Statistics, Law, Languages, Art and Information.

The majors are Certified Public Accountant, International Accounting, Financial Accounting, Auditing, Statistics, Ventures Management, International Banking, Monetary and Banking, English Language and Literature, Business Japanese, International Trade, E-commerce, Art Design, Business Law.

=== Campus ===
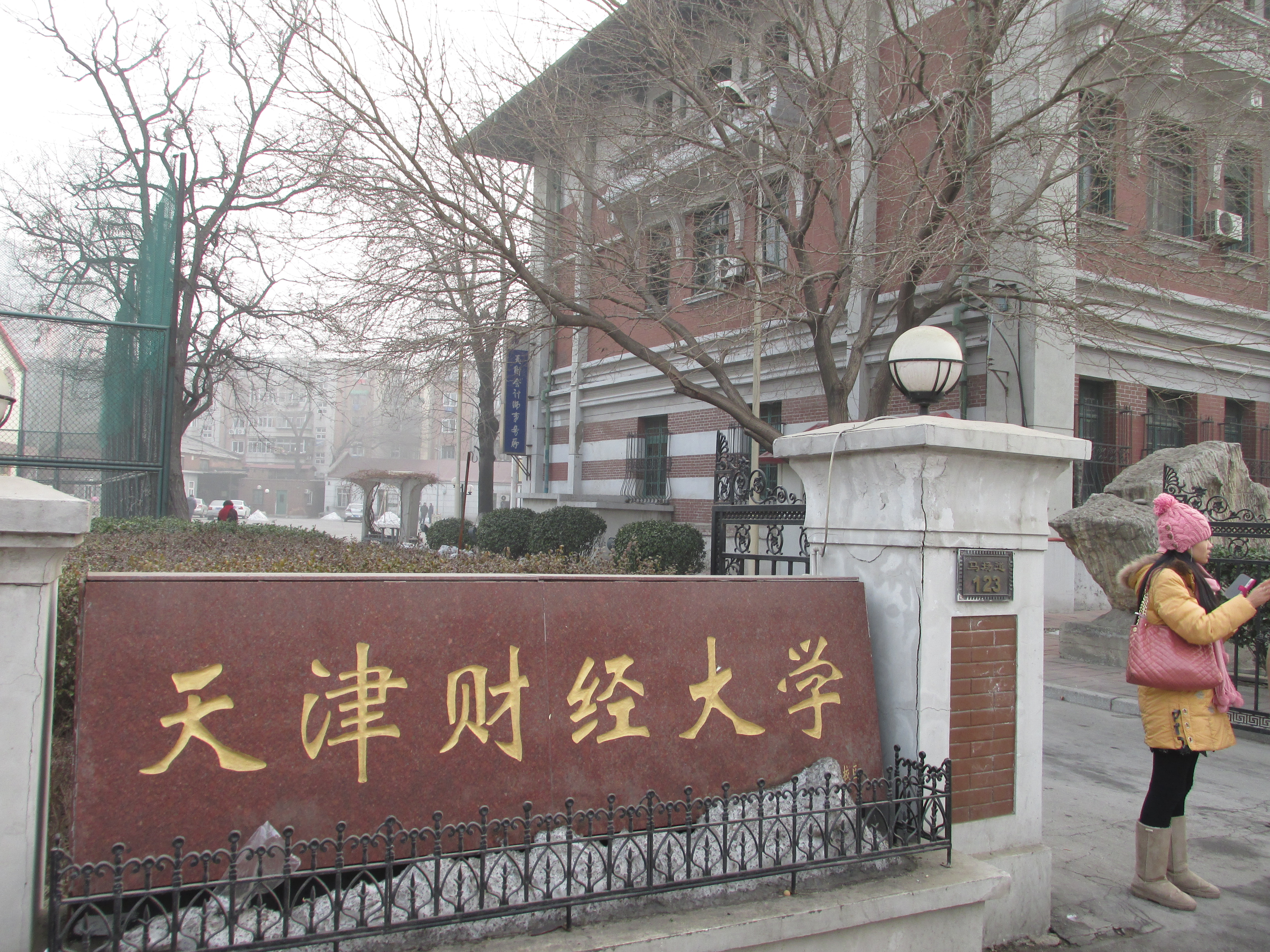
Gate of Machangdao Campus

The main campus of the university is at 25 Zhujiang Road, Hexi District, Tianjin. Most departments and research center are in here. The Machangdao campus is in the central district of Tianjin near Tianjin Institute of Foreign Languages. The university covers 800,000 m^{2}, with a floor space of 455,600 m^{2}. The First Classroom Building and the Old Library in the 'west campus' is part of the history of TUFE. Along with TUFE library, the new classroom buildings and many new comprehensive buildings in the 'east campus' are the new faces of the university. The library has books and reference materials in Chinese and other languages. Most current main economics journals such as the American Economic Review, Journal of Finance, and Quarterly Journal of Economics are available for all students for their independent research.

TUFE provides apartments with rooms normally shared by two or four students. Gyms and a sub-library are in the apartments area.

Because TUFE women's basketball team is the national champion for several consecutive years, the most popular game in TUFE is basketball.

The university covers 80 hectares, with a floor space of 400,000 square meters.

=== International cooperation ===
The International Exchange Center is a multi-functional building with cafeteria, accommodation and classrooms.

The university has always been actively engaged in international exchange, as evidenced by the fact that it has successively established liaisons with more than 50 universities and research institutes in about 20 countries and regions, such as the United States, Canada, Australia, New Zealand, Japan, South Korea, Malaysia, Singapore, India, Great Britain, France, Sweden, Russia, Germany, Belgium, Greece, etc. So far, more than 1,000 overseas students and students from Hong Kong, Macao and Taiwan have come to study in the university, among whom many have been conferred doctor, master or bachelor's degrees.

== See also ==
- Tsin Ku University
