= Tianjin Foreign Studies University =

Municipal public university in Tianjin, China

Coordinates: 39.1070°N 117.2030°E

- 天津外国语大学 (Chinese)
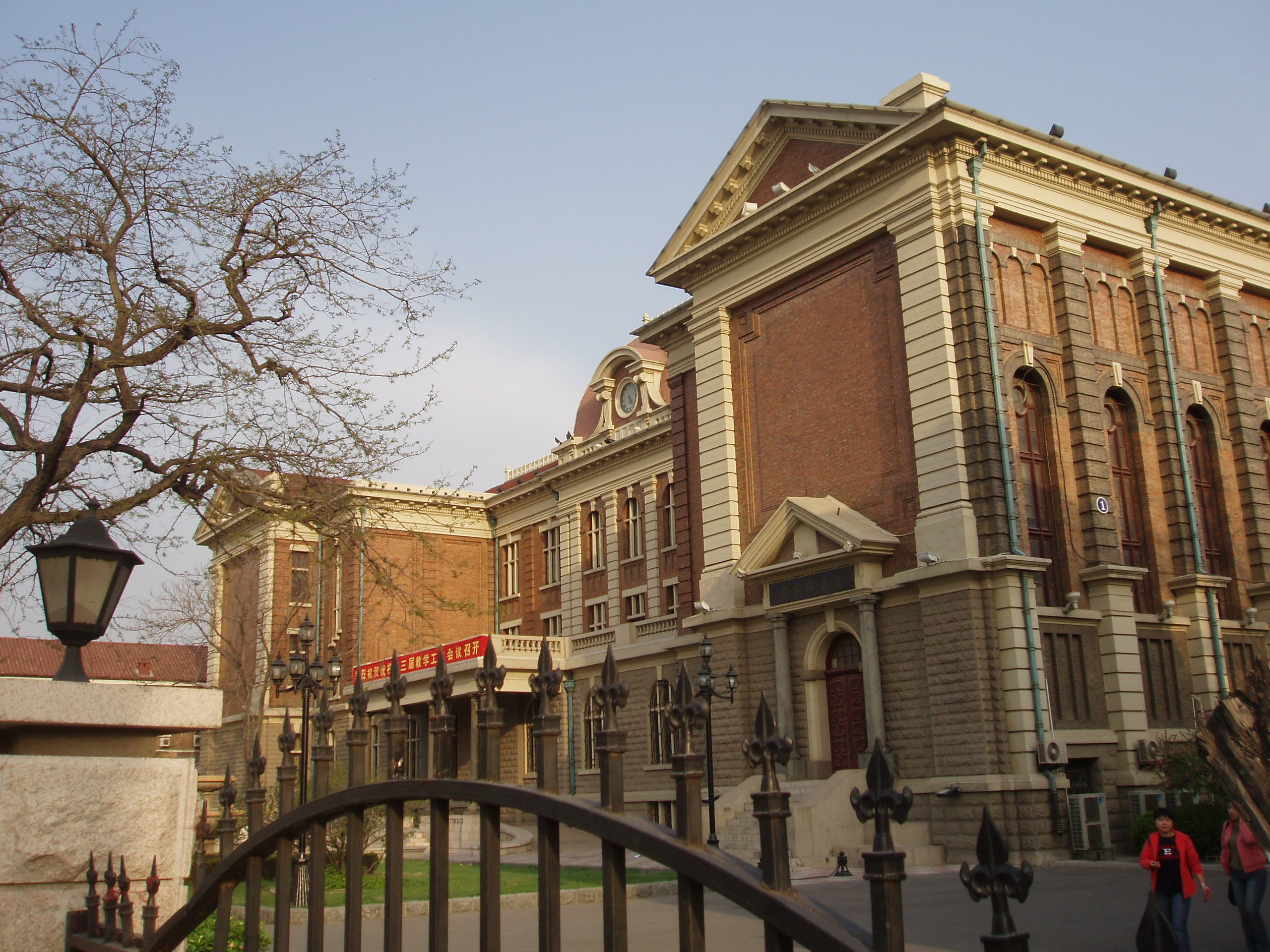
- Motto: 中外求索，德业竞进
- Motto in English: Seeking Knowledge from Both Chinese and Foreign Sources; Pursuing Virtue and Excellence.
- Type: Public university
- Established: 1964
- Location: Tianjin, China
- Campus: Urban
- Website: tjfsu.edu.cn

Chinese name
- Simplified Chinese: 天津外国语大学
- Traditional Chinese: 天津外國語大學
Transcriptions
Standard Mandarin
- Hanyu Pinyin: Tiānjīn Wàiguóyǔ Dàxué

Tianjin Foreign Studies University (TFSU; 天津外国语大学) is a municipal public university of foreign languages in Tianjin, China. It is affiliated with the City of Tianjin and funded by the Tianjin Municipal People's Government.

The earliest predecessor of Tianjin Foreign Studies University was founded in 1964 as Tianjin Foreign Languages Vocational School. In 1974, the Tianjin Foreign Languages College was established by the merger of the then Tianjin Foreign Languages Vocational School, Tianjin Foreign Languages School, the Japanese Department of Tianjin Teachers College, and the Foreign Languages Department and the Chinese Departments of Hebei University. In 1981, the school received accreditation for the granting of master's degrees. In 2010, the school was renamed Tianjin Foreign Studies University. In May 2026, a partnership agreement was approved between TFSU and the University of Aberdeen.
