= Émile Licent =

French Jesuit and natural historian

Émile Licent

The original museum is now protected as a heritage site by the Tianjin Municipal People's Government. Photo taken in May 2006.

Émile Licent (1876–1952; with the adopted Chinese name, 桑志华, while he was working in China) was a French Jesuit trained as a natural historian. He spent more than twenty-five years researching in Tianjin. His expeditions spread across various parts of Northern and Central China (including the provinces of Shandong, Hebei, Shanxi, Henan, Shaanxi, Gansu, Inner Mongolia and eastern part of the Tibetan Plateau).

Upon his first arrival at Tianjin in 1914, he established the Musée Hoangho Paiho (it was known as the 'Beijiang Museum' among the Chinese), one of the earliest of its kind in China. The Museum survived the Second World War and changed its name to Tianjin Natural History Museum (TMNH) in 1952. He was a colleague of Pierre Teilhard de Chardin in conducting archeological research in northern provinces of China in the 1920s. He and Chardin were the first to examine the Shuidonggou (水洞沟) (Ordos Upland, Inner Mongolia) archaeological site in northern China. Resent analysis of flaked stone artifacts from the most recent (1980) excavation at this site has identified an assemblage which constitutes the southernmost occurrence of an Initial Upper Paleolithic blade technology proposed to have originated in the Altai region of Southern Siberia. The lowest levels of the site are now dated from 40,000 to 25,000 years ago.

He left China during the Second World War in 1939 after appointing one of his colleagues, Pierre Leroy (adopted Chinese name, 罗学宾), as Deputy Director of the Museum. Most of the Quaternary mammal fossils and prehistoric human relics and tools that he and his colleagues discovered remain in the Museum.

He was awarded an Order (铁十字骑士勋章) by the French government for his pioneering scientific works and explorations in China.

Nothing much is known about his life or religious activities in France before and after his stay in China.
