= Hebei University =

Public university in Baoding, Hebei, China

Coordinates: 38°52′17″N 115°31′03″E

- 河北大学
- Former names: Tianjin Business Institute, Tsin Ku University, Tianjin Normal College, Tianjin Normal University
- Motto: 实事求是，笃学诚行
- Established: 1921
- Location: Baoding, Hebei, China
- Website: www.hbu.edu.cn

Hebei University (河北大学) is a provincial public university in Baoding, Hebei, China.

The university has approximately 42,000 full-time students, including over 6,400 postgraduate students and about 28,000 undergraduates.

== History ==
The university was founded in 1921 as the "Institut des Hautes Études et Commerciales des Tientsin" by French Jesuits in Tianjin. The next four decades saw the university significantly changed, during which it was known by the names of Tsin Ku University (津沽大学), Tianjin Normal College, and Tianjin Normal University, respectively. In 1960, the university was reformed as a comprehensive University and renamed as Hebei University. In 1970, three years after Tianjin was designated as an autonomous municipality, which rendered it outside of the jurisdiction of Hebei province, the university was moved to Baoding.

== Campus ==
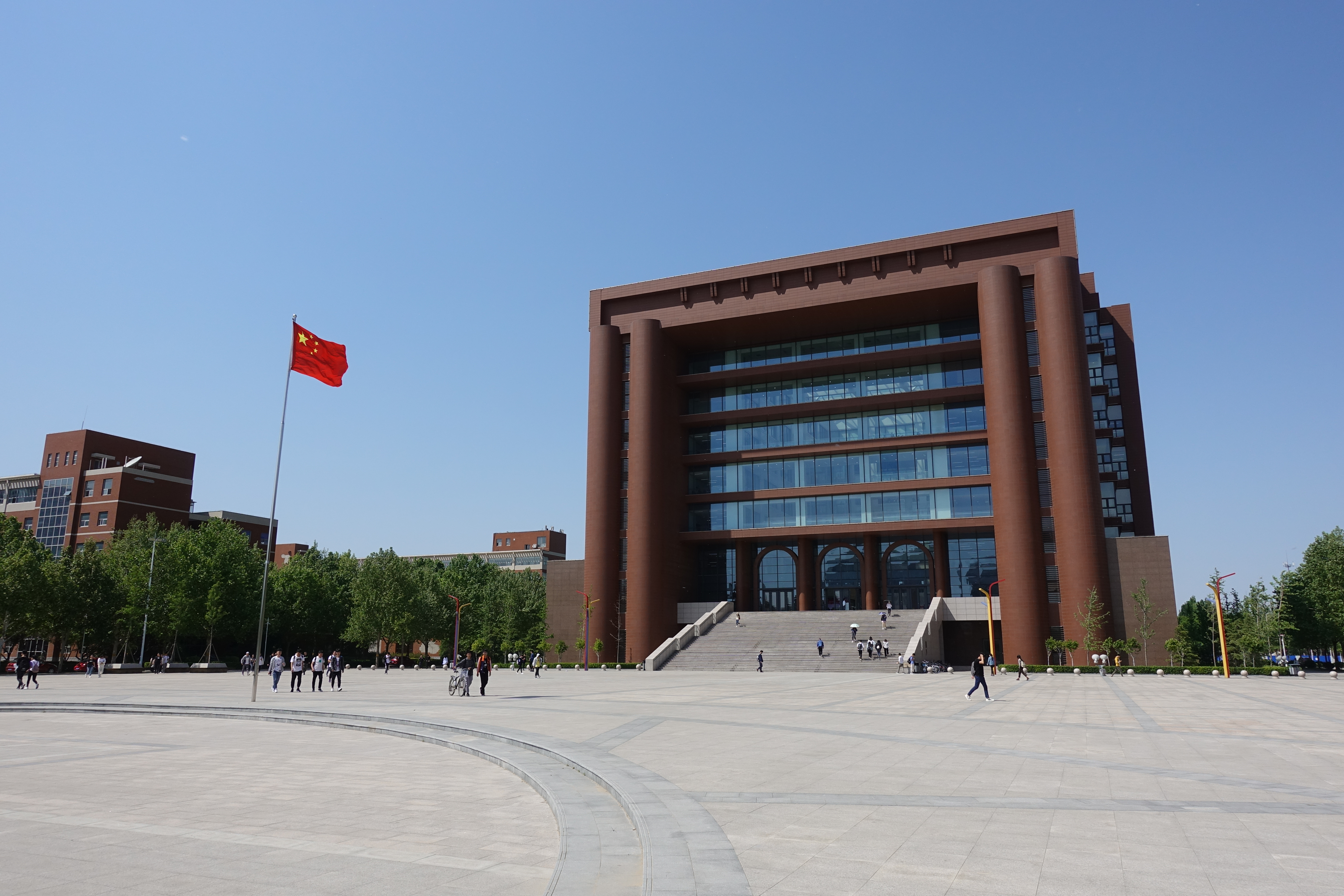
New campus

The university campus covers an area of over 700 acres (2.8 km^{2}). The university library has a collection of 3,900,000 books and 5,000 periodicals. It has one of the largest collections of rare books among Chinese universities. The university museum houses more than 8,000 objects, over 70 of which are designated as national treasures and protected by law. The museum also possesses some rare specimens of animals and plants.

== Curriculum ==
As a comprehensive university, Hebei University offers a variety of courses covering a wide range of fields, including Philosophy, Economics, Law, Education, Literature, History, Science and Technology, Engineering, Medicine, and Management. The 15 colleges offer 85 specialized undergraduate courses leading to bachelor's degrees. The university can also award master's degrees in 140 subjects and doctorates in 12 fields.

== Rankings ==
Hebei University consistently ranks one of the top two universities in Hebei Province on a variety of criteria and is consistently ranked top 80 in China.

The Chinese University Ranking (Wu Shulian) rankings by year:

Year	2012	2011	2010	2009	2008	2007	2006	2005	2004	2003	2002
National Ranking	80	78	80	77	76	77	81	86	81	82	75

== Notable people ==
The university employs 3,372 teaching and administrative staff, including 1,910 engaged in teaching and research, with 417 professors and 722 associate professors.

Notable faculty members include:

- Yin Xiangchu, member of the Chinese Academy of Sciences, recognized for research on locust habitats.
- Song Daxiang, arachnologist and author of The Arachnids of China.
- Wei Chunjiang, microbiologist known for his studies of lichens.
- Qi Xia, historian specializing in the economy of the Song dynasty, author of The Economic History of the Song Dynasty.
- Teng Dachun, historian of education, author of The History of Education in the United States.
