= Tianjin Normal University =

University in Tianjin, China

Coordinates: 39.0600°N 117.1200°E

- 天津师范大学
- Motto: 勤奋严谨，自树树人
- Type: Public
- Established: 1958
- President: Dr. Yinghua Zhong
- Faculty: 1,396 full time
- Students: 31,876; 2069 postgrad
- Postgraduates: 1000
- Location: Tianjin, China
- Campus: Urban
- Nickname: Tianjin Shida 天津师大
- Website: www.tjnu.edu.cn

Tianjin Normal University (TNU) (Chinese: 天津师范大学; pinyin: Tiānjīn shīfàn dàxué) is a public research university founded in 1958 in Tianjin, China. In 2017–2018, Chinese University Alumni Association (CUAA) ranks Tianjin Normal University 3rd in normal universities in north China.

== History ==
Tianjin Normal University was founded in 1958.

In April 1999, with the approval by the Ministry of Education, Tianjin Municipal Committee of the CPC and Tianjin Municipal Government decided to found the new Tianjin Normal University by integrating the old Tianjin Normal University, Tianjin Teachers' Training Academy, and Tianjin Educational Institute.

In 2001, the first Confucius Institute in Africa opened as a collaboration between Tianjin Normal University and Kenya's University of Nairobi.

Approaved by Tianjin Municipal Government in March 2003, the construction project of the new campus of TNU was officially initiated. TNU now has 23 colleges, 1 independent college, 49 research institutes, and 87 specialties for undergraduates (including 56 specialties for 4-year students and 31 for 2-year students). Offering programs at various levels and in many disciplines, the university has developed a unique system of education, with a series of pre- and in – service training courses and different levels of education for different purposes: for academic degrees, for diplomas or simply for training. The programs offered have already covered 8 of the 11 academic disciplines for undergraduates. TNU also boasts the "Psychology and Behavior Research Center", one of the one hundred major humanities and social sciences research centers under the Ministry of Education, Tianjin research lab of modern Pedagogical techniques, a key lab of water environment and water resources and a research center for politics and humanistic social science. It also has an affiliated middle school and an affiliated primary school.

== Campus ==
=== Ba Li Tai ===
The Ba Li Tai Campus is situated on Wei Jin Road in the heart of downtown Tianjin. It now hosts international students studying in Tianjin Normal University who take Chinese as the second language.

=== Xi Qing ===
Tianjin Normal University's Xi Qing Campus is situated on West Bin Shui Avenue. The campus hosts 23 colleges and 50 research organisations and 87 undergraduate departments. 20,540 full-time students currently study at Tianjin Normal University.

== See also ==
- Tsin Ku University
