= Tianjin Natural History Museum =

Tianjin Museum of Natural History
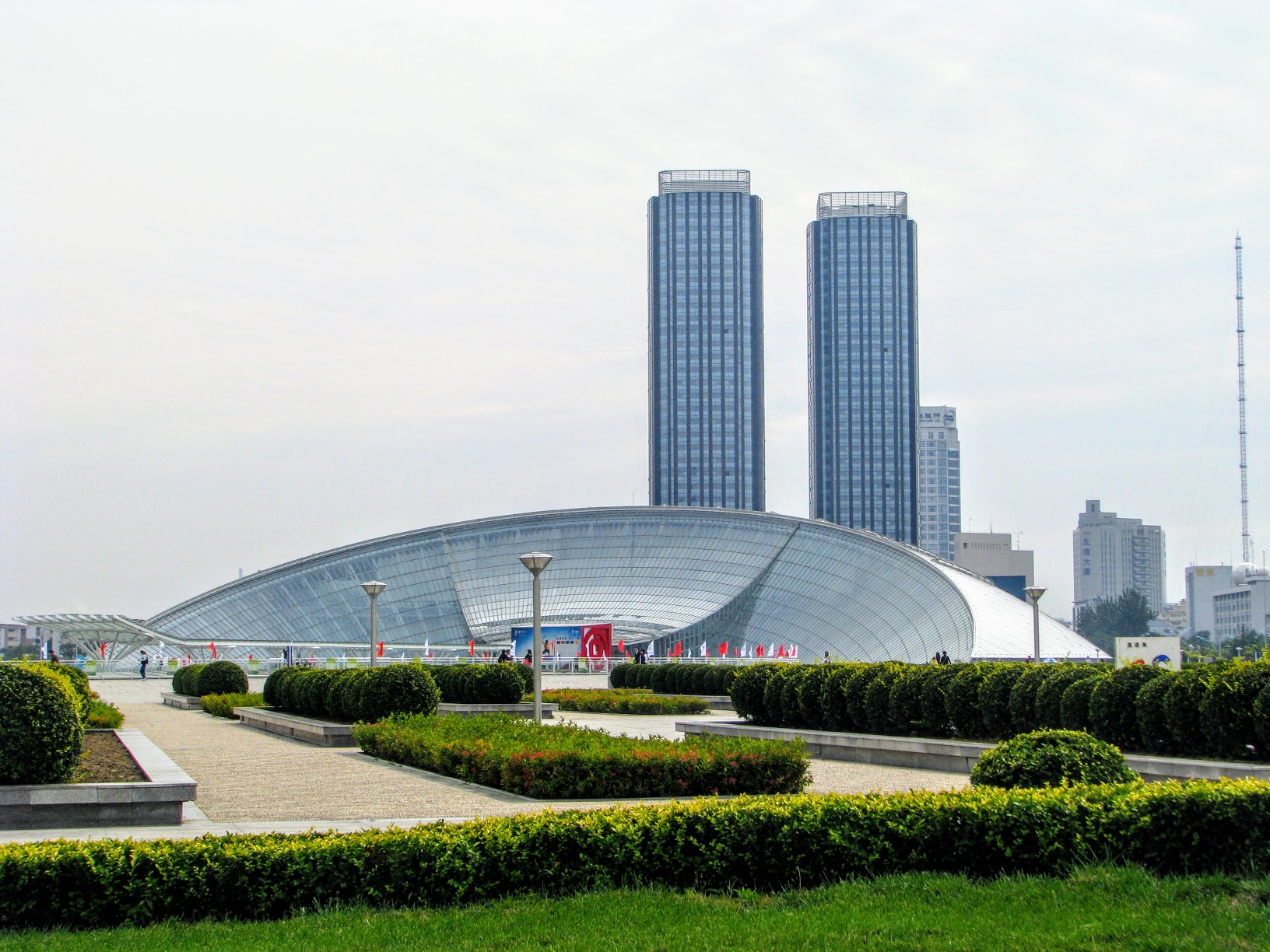
- Former name: Tianjin Natural Museum
- Established: 1914
- Location: No.31 Youyi Road, Hexi District, Tianjin, China
- Coordinates: 39.085°N 117.209°E
- Type: Natural History Museum

Tianjin Natural History Museum is in Tianjin, China, and is located in No. 31 Youyi Road, in the Hexi District. It was founded in 1914 as the Hoangho Paiho Museum. The museum has three floors and spans an area of 12,000 square meters. Over 380,000 geological and biological specimens are currently held at the museum.

== History ==
The museum was founded in 1914 by Émile Licent, and was called the Hoangho Paiho Museum. For 25 years since the museum's founding, Licent conducted explorations in the Yellow River Basin and the Haihe River Basin, with the full length of the exploration stretching 50,000 kilometers. During these explorations, Licent collected over 200,000 paleontology, animal, plant, ancient human, and rock specimens. The Hoangho Paiho Museum was eventually renamed the Northern Border Museum. After the People's Republic of China was founded, the Northern Border Museum was hosted by Tianjin University, one of the largest multidisciplinary engineering universities in China. In June 1952, after the establishment of the Tianjin People's Science Museum Preparatory Committee, the Tianjin People's Science Museum was established, and was renamed to the Tianjin Nature Museum in 1957. In 1959, the museum's exhibit's were relocated to 272 Machang Road in the Hexi District. In August 1968, the Tianjin Museum of History, the Tianjin Museum of Art, and the Tianjin Museum of Nature merged to form the Tianjin Museum. In January 1974, the Tianjin Museum was renamed the Tianjin Natural Museum. In 1997, the Tianjin Municipal Party Committee and government invested 100 million yuan to renovate the museum, with the renovation being completed in 1998. In 2013, the museum once again was renovated, and opened in 2014, at a new site in the Tianjin Cultural Center.

== Major specimens and exhibitions ==
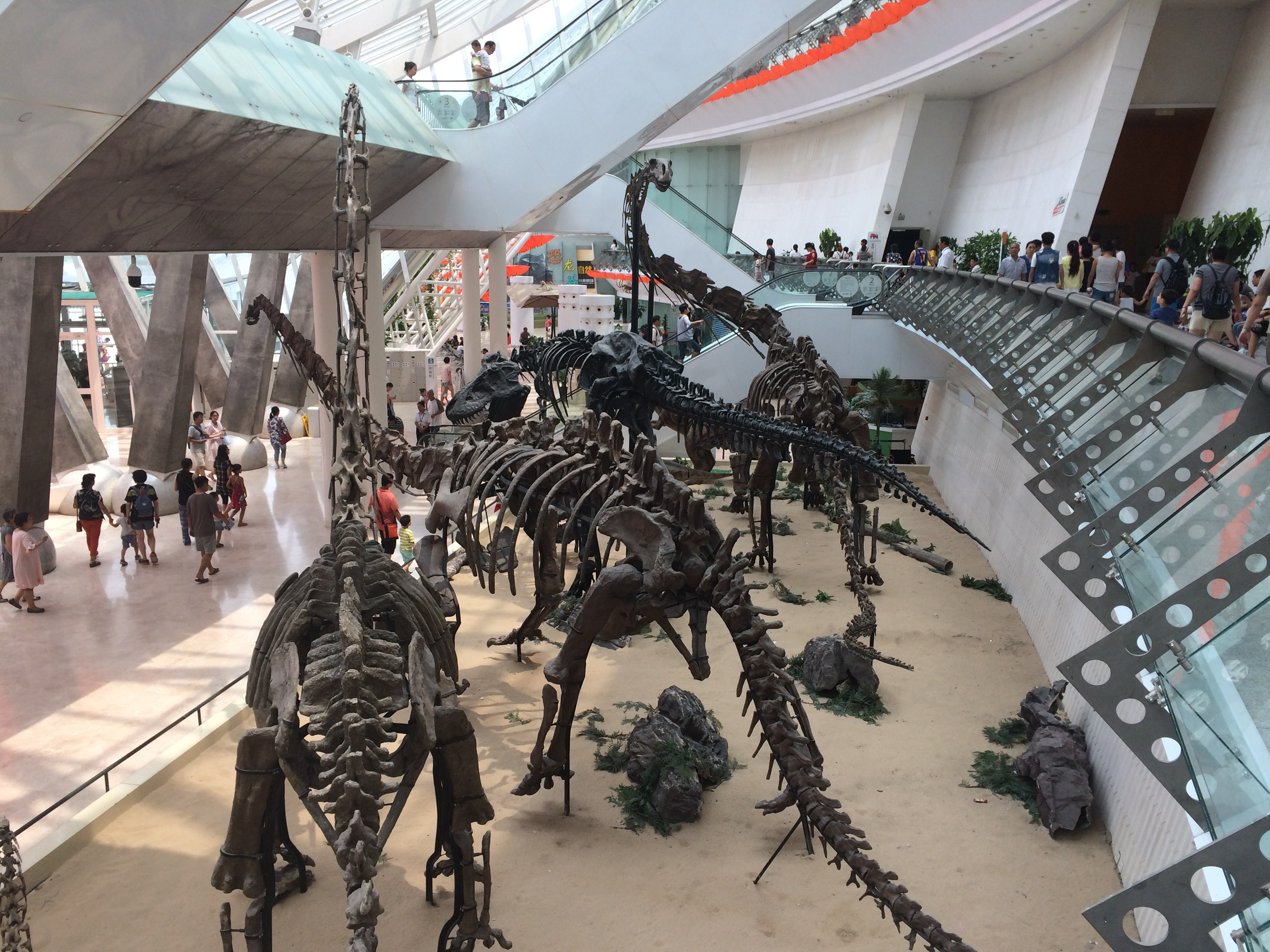
The lobby of the museum.

The lobby of the museum displays several dinosaurs, including a cast of a Tyrannosaurus Rex and skeletal mounts of Mamenchisaurus, Omeisaurus, and Bellusaurus.

=== The Ancient Earth and the Modern Earth ===
The displays on the second floor are divided into two parts: The Ancient Homeland, and the Modern Homeland. The exhibit is organized into eight sections: The Birth of Life, The Cambrian Explosion, Competition for the Ocean, The Transition onto Land, Diversity of Evolution, The Flight of Birds, Mammalian Radiation, and Human Origins and Biological Intelligence. The Birth of Life deals with the beginning of life, 3.8 billion years ago, and features fossils of ammonties and other invertebrates. The Cambrian Explosion deals with the sudden diversity of life in the Cambrian period, Competition for the Ocean deals with life in the ocean, and features modern and prehistoric sea life, such as icthyosaurs, sharks, placoderms, and octopodes, as well as many modern and prehistoric examples of underwater plant life. The Transition onto Land deals with life moving onto land, and features giant sculptures of modern bugs, synapsids like Lystrosaurus, and petrified wood. Diversity of Evolution deals with the appearance of dinosaurs and other archosaurs, in which many large mounts of dinosaurs like Omeisaurus, Triceratops, and Lambeosaurus are featured, as well as a collection of fossilized dinosaur eggs. There are also pterosaur displays, in which a large Dsungaripterus skeleton is laid out. The Flight of Birds deals with the evolution of birds from dinosaurs, and features several filamented non-avian dinosaurs such as Dilong, and several fossils of early birds, such as Confuciusornis. Many modern birds are also exhibited. Mammalian Radiation deals with the rise of mammals as dominant land animals, and has a central display of proboscidean evolution, featuring Platybelodon, Stegodon, and a woolly mammoth. It also features cats like Homotherium, and a display of whale evolution. A modern moose is also displayed. Human Origins and Biological Intelligence deals with the evolution of hominids, and features a bust and several casts of the Peking Man, an example of Homo erectus.

=== Earth's Ecology ===
This exhibit spans an area of 3400 square meters, on the third floor of the museum. Tianjin honorary citizen Kenneth Behring donated over 200 rare specimens of wild animals, which are displayed along with the museum's own collection. The exhibit highlights the design of ecosystems, and the vast diversity of different ecosystems around the world. The exhibit is divided into seven sections: Australia: Continent of Living Fossils, South America: The Magical Rainforest, North America: The Wild New World, Antarctica: Snow and Ice, Arctic: Melting Glaciers, Africa: The Original Wild and Dead, and Eurasia: The Symphony of Life.

== Gallery ==
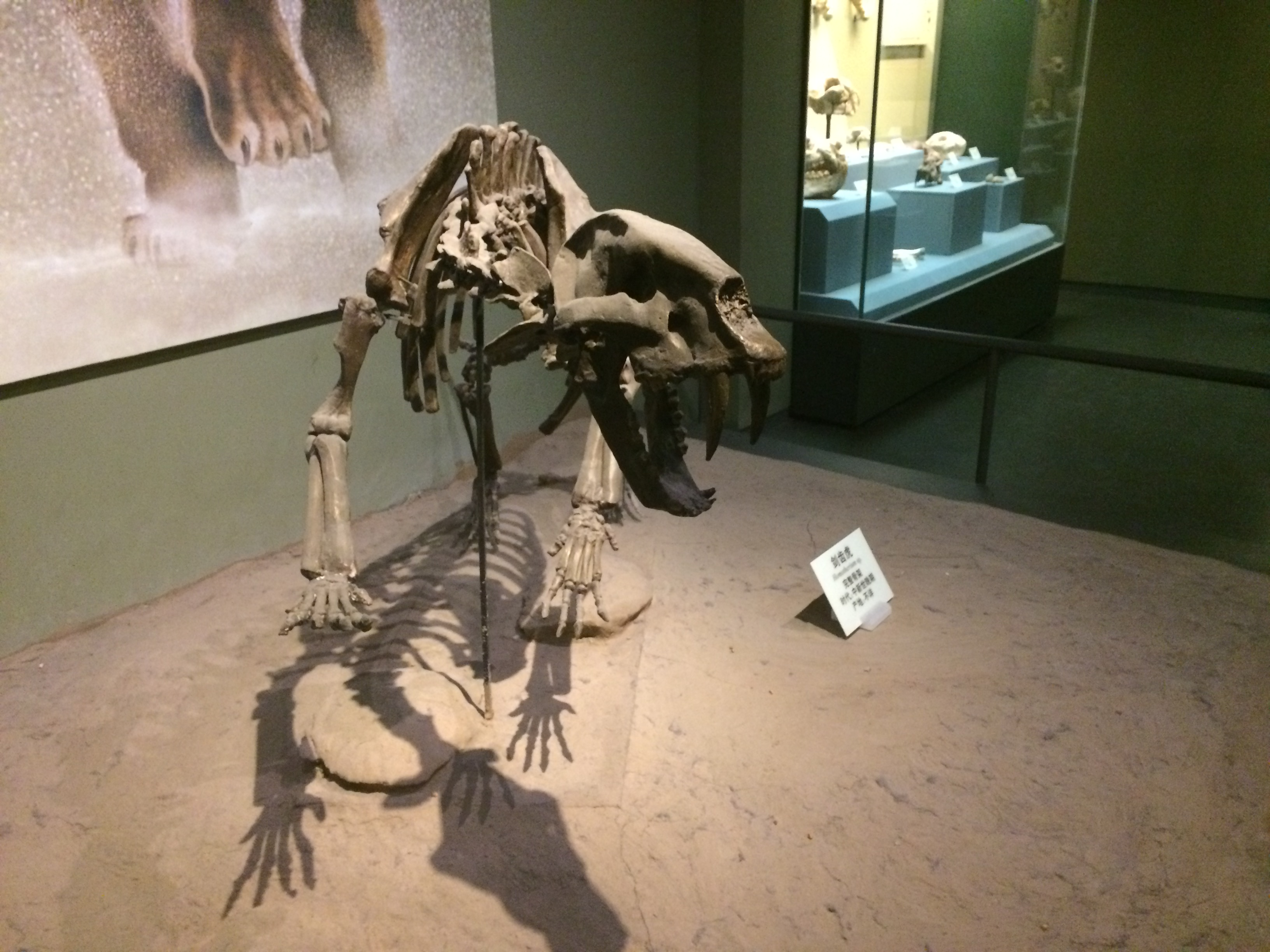
A Homotherium mounted at the museum.

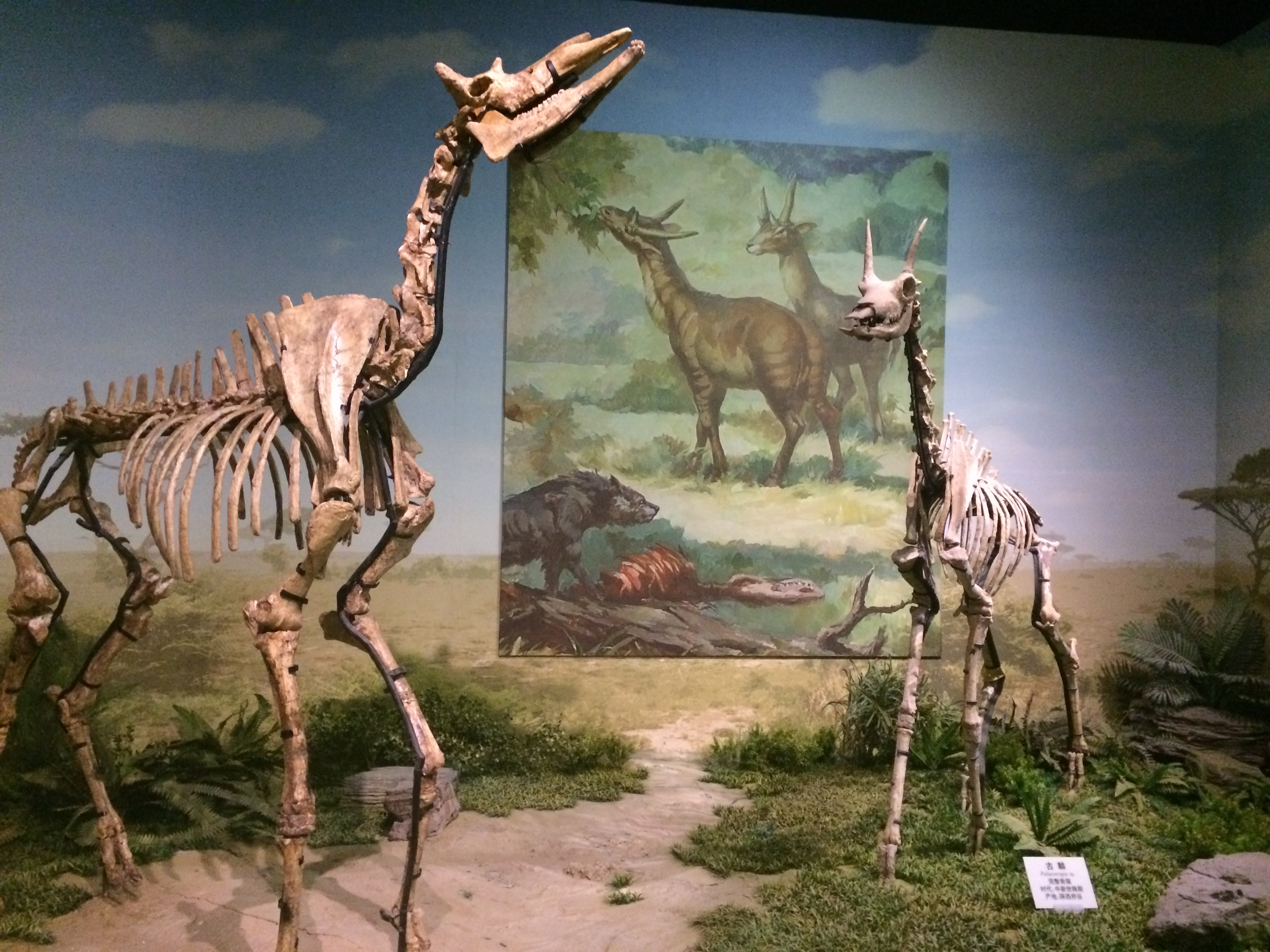
Two giraffids on display in the Cenozoic gallery.

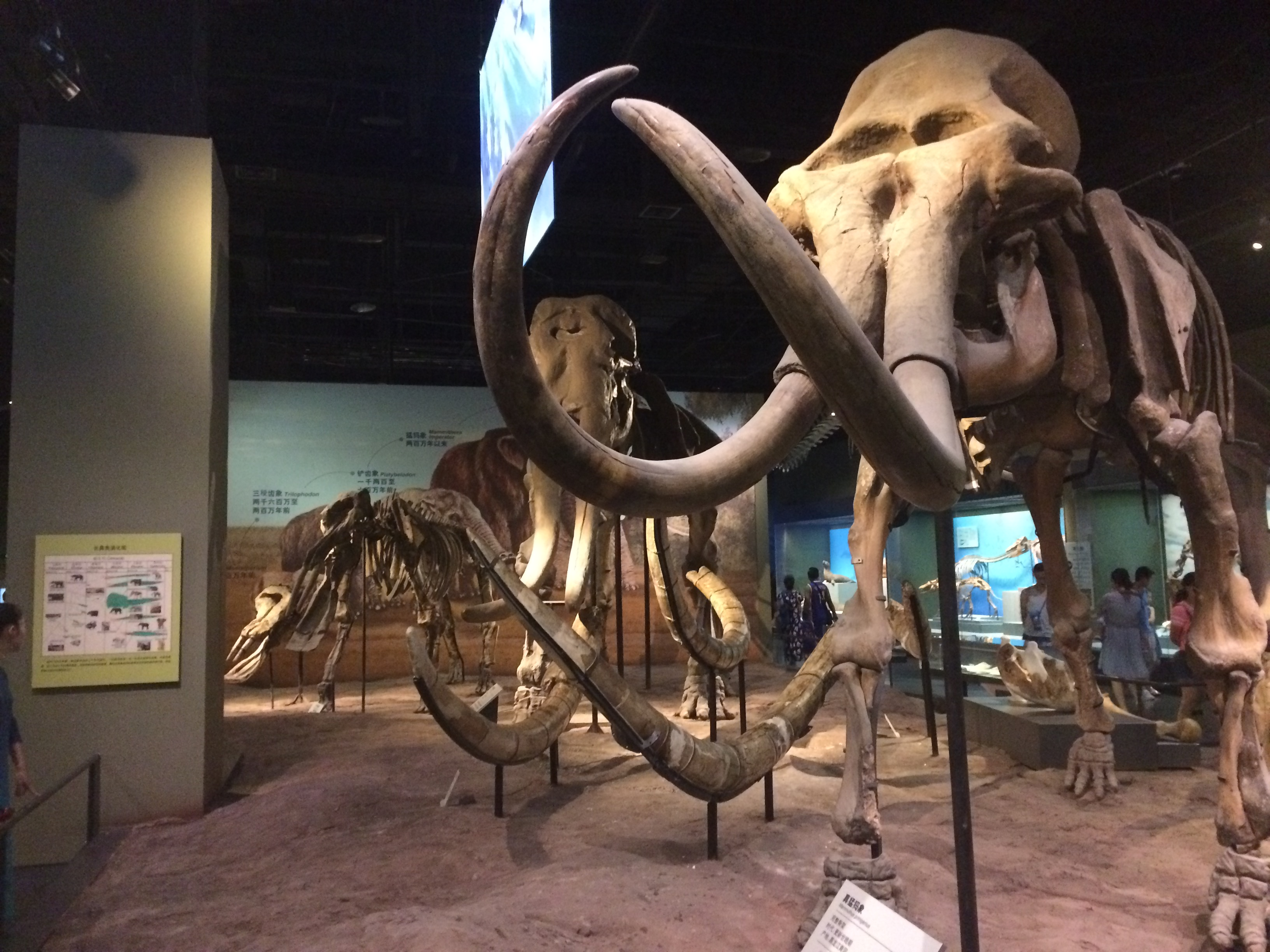
The centerpiece of the Cenozoic hall, Platybelodon, Stegodon, and a Woolly Mammoth mount.

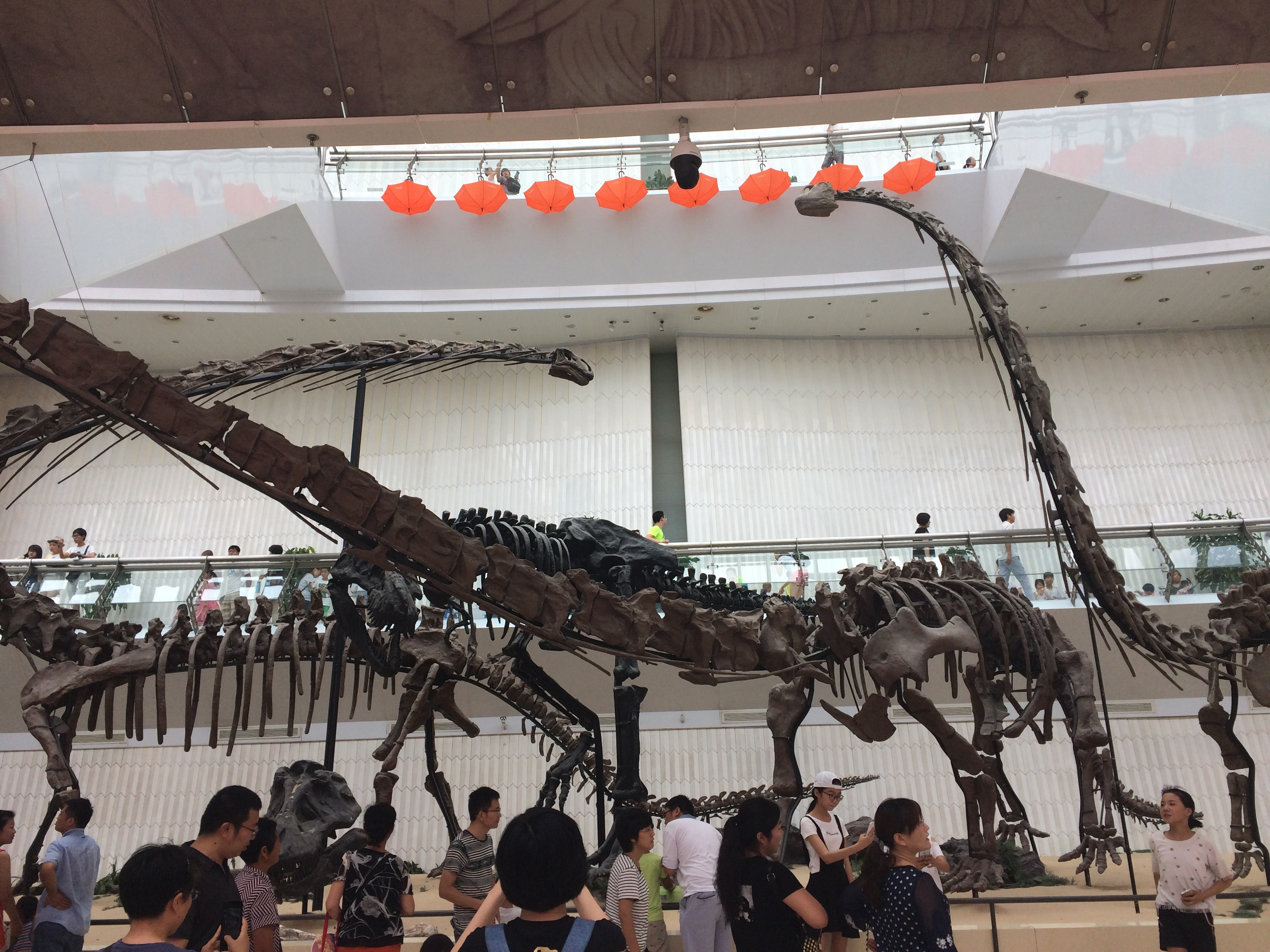
The lobby viewed from the first floor.

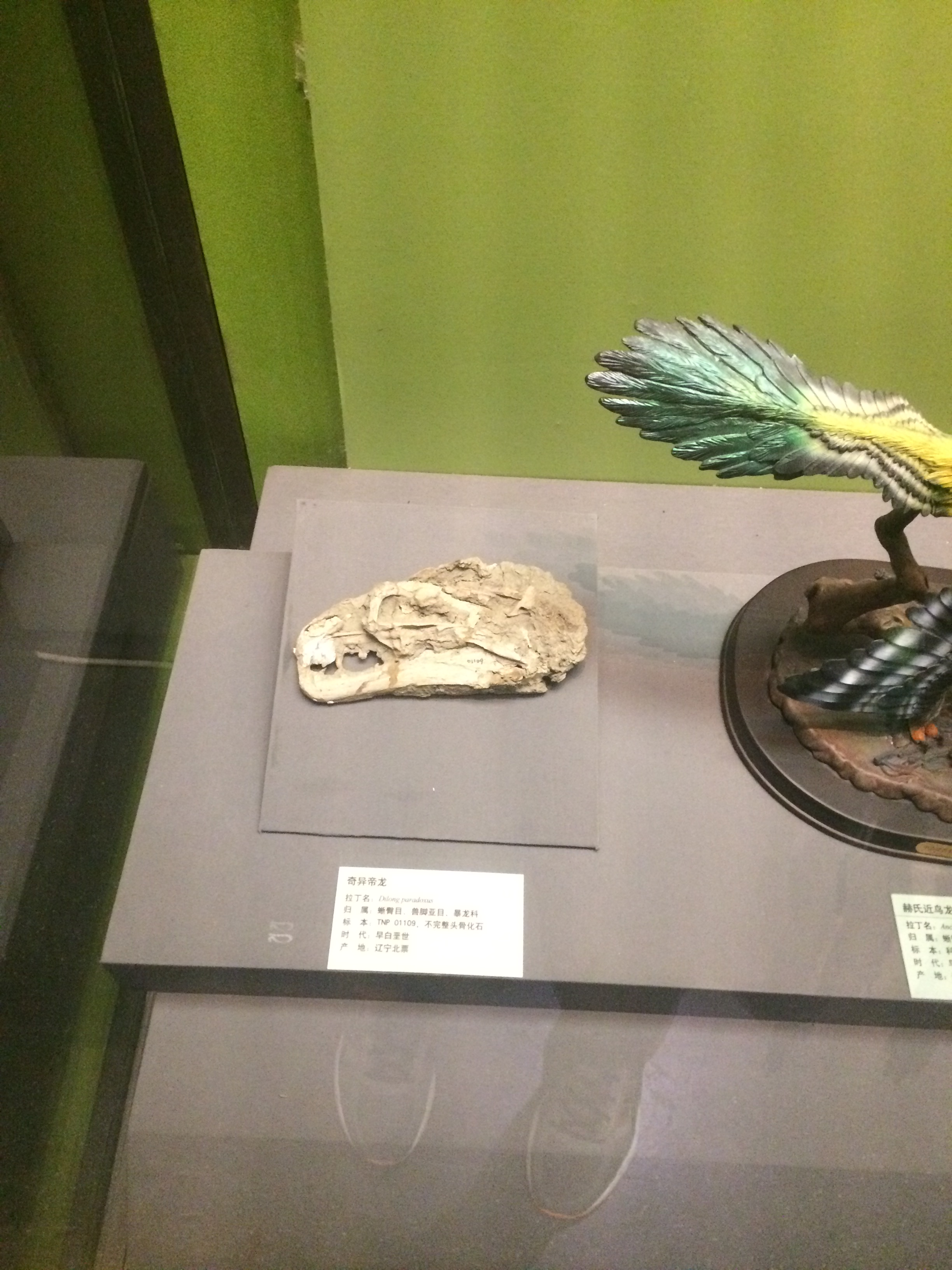
A Dilong skull, TNP 01109, in the bird gallery.

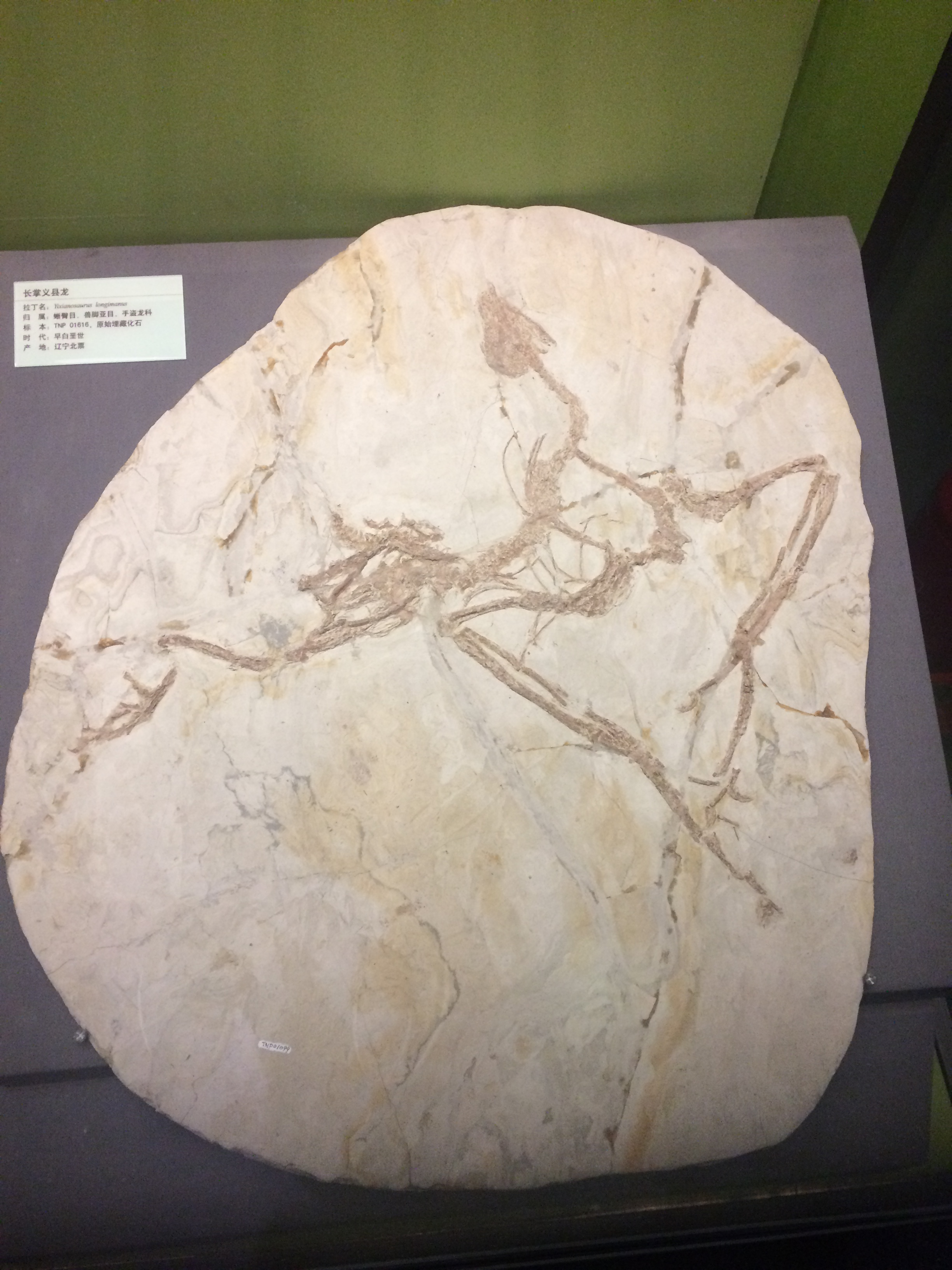
Yixianornis specimen TNP 01616 at the museum.

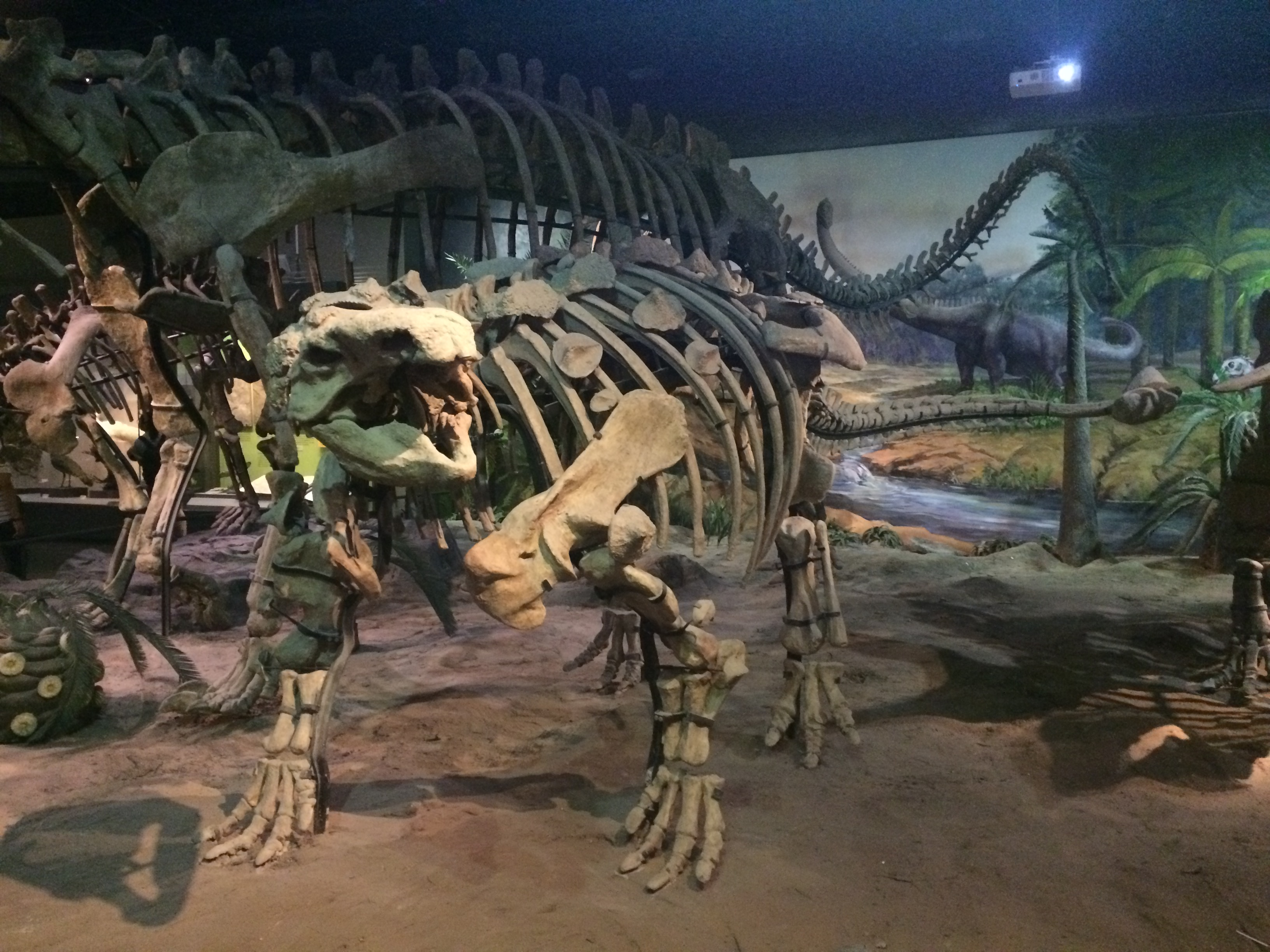
An Ankylosaurus cast in the dinosaur hall.

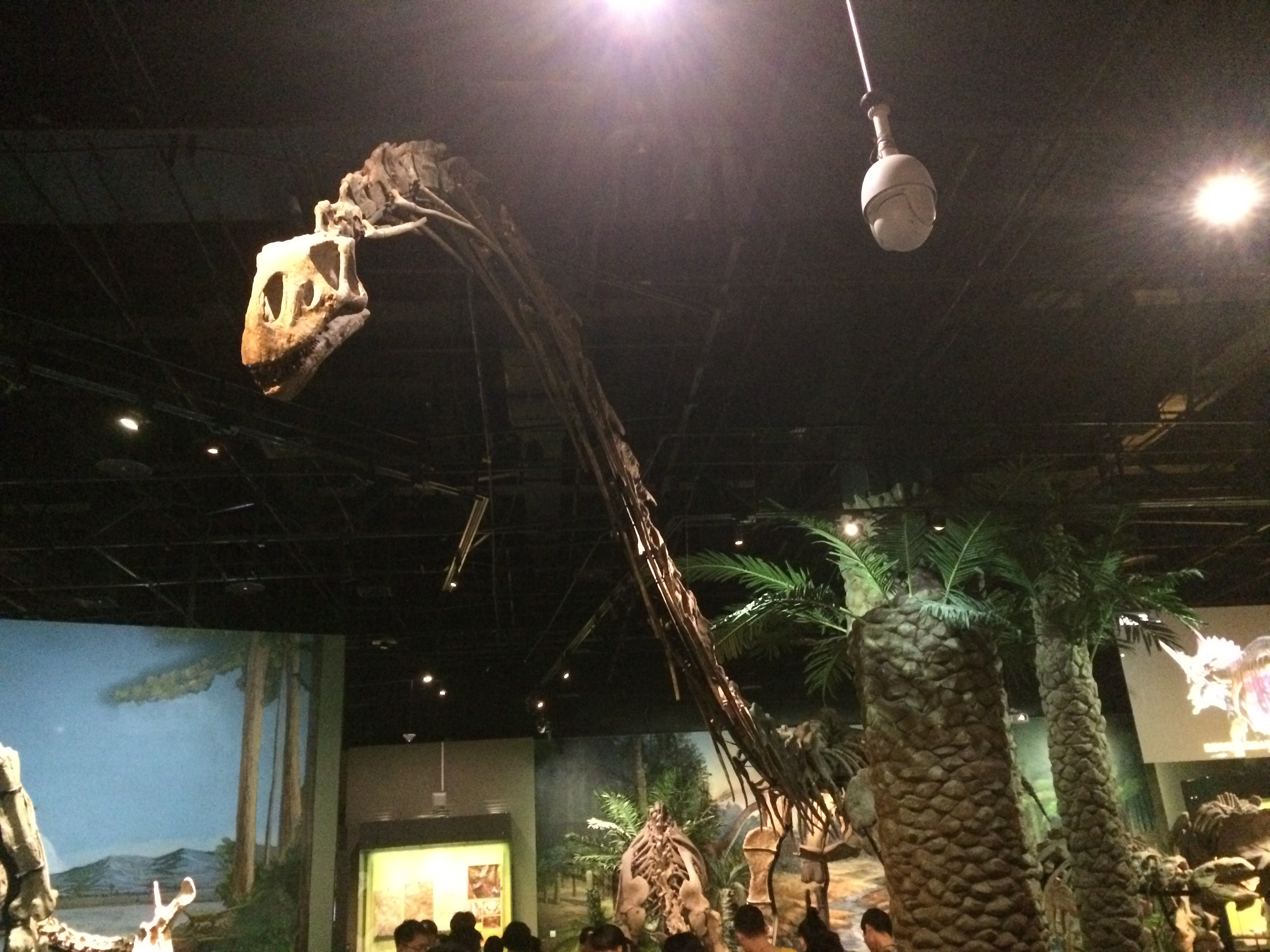
A Mamenchisaurus mount in the dinosaur hall.

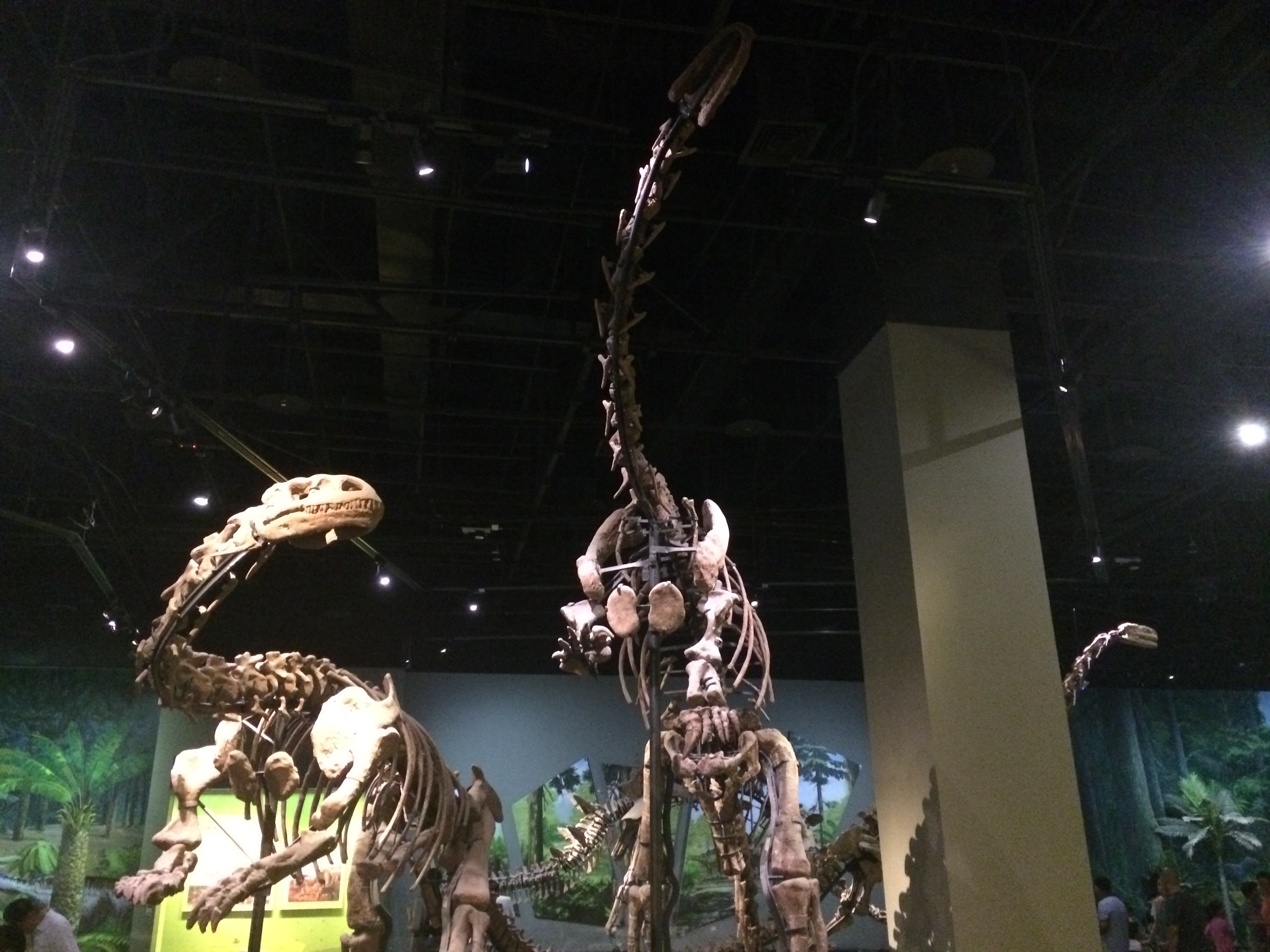
A pair of Lufengosaurus mounted at the museum.

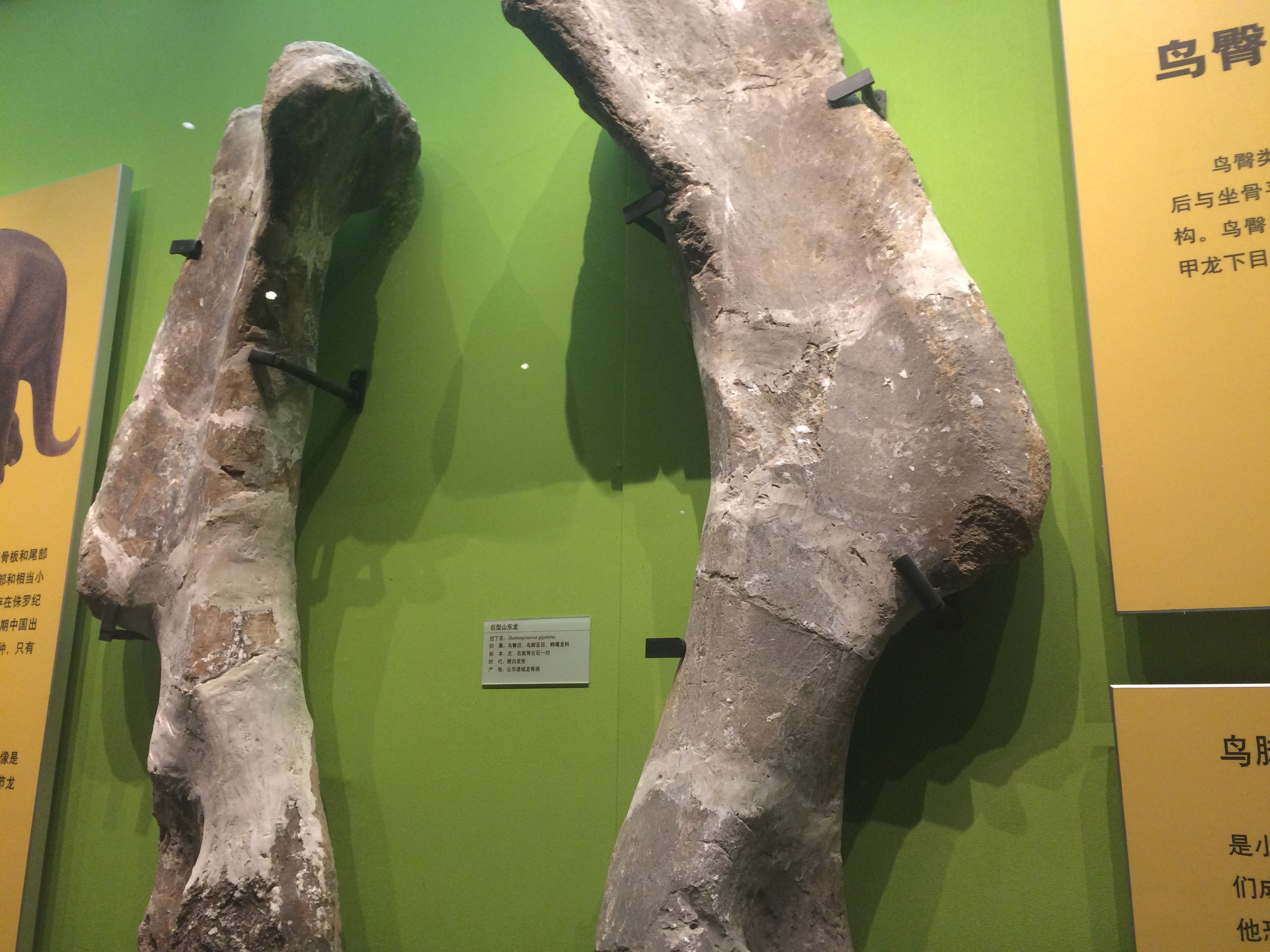
The shoulders of Shantungosaurus on display at the museum.

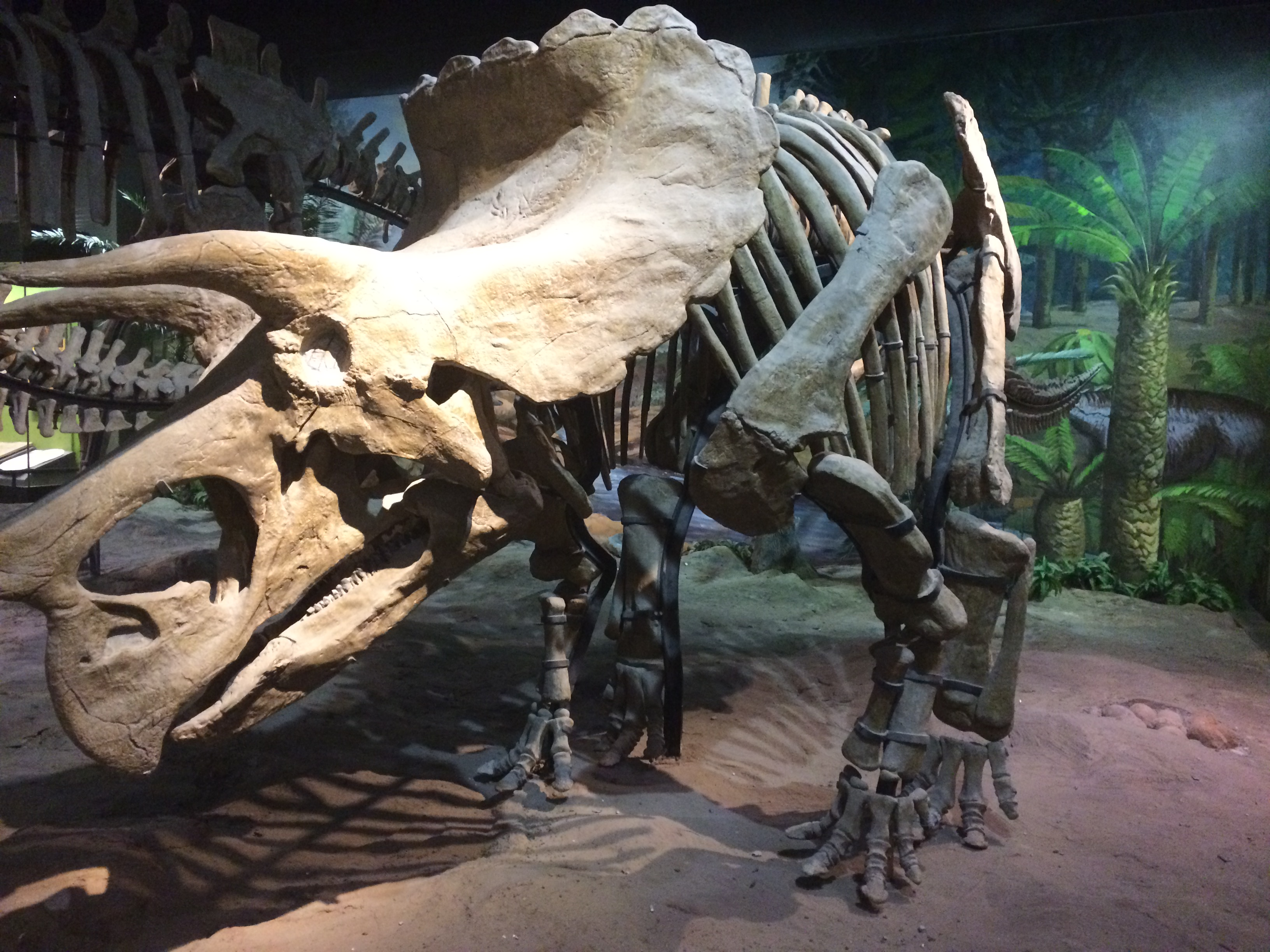
A Triceratops cast mounted at the museum.

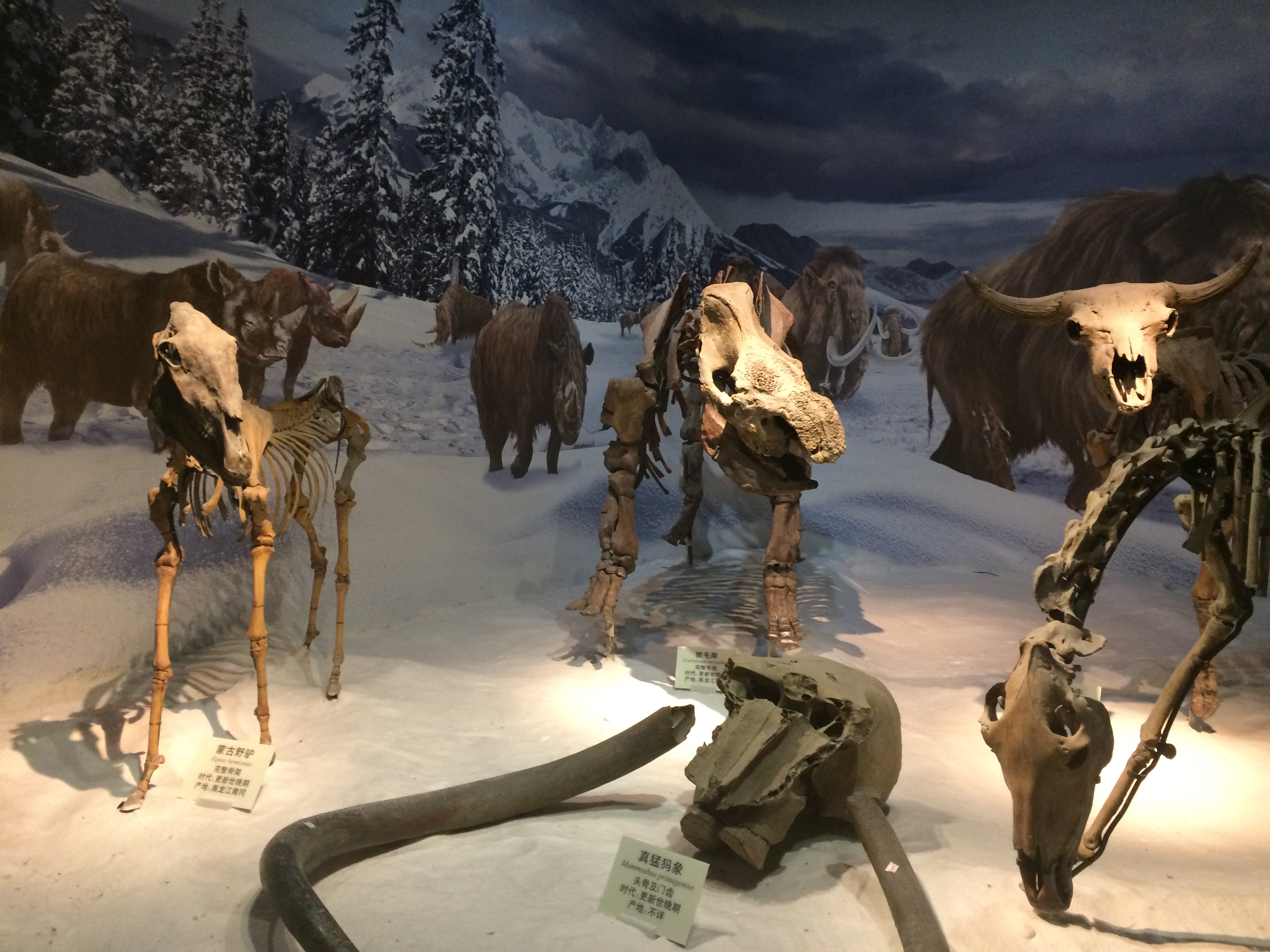
Aurochs and other prehistoric mammals mounted in a scene in the Cenozoic hall.

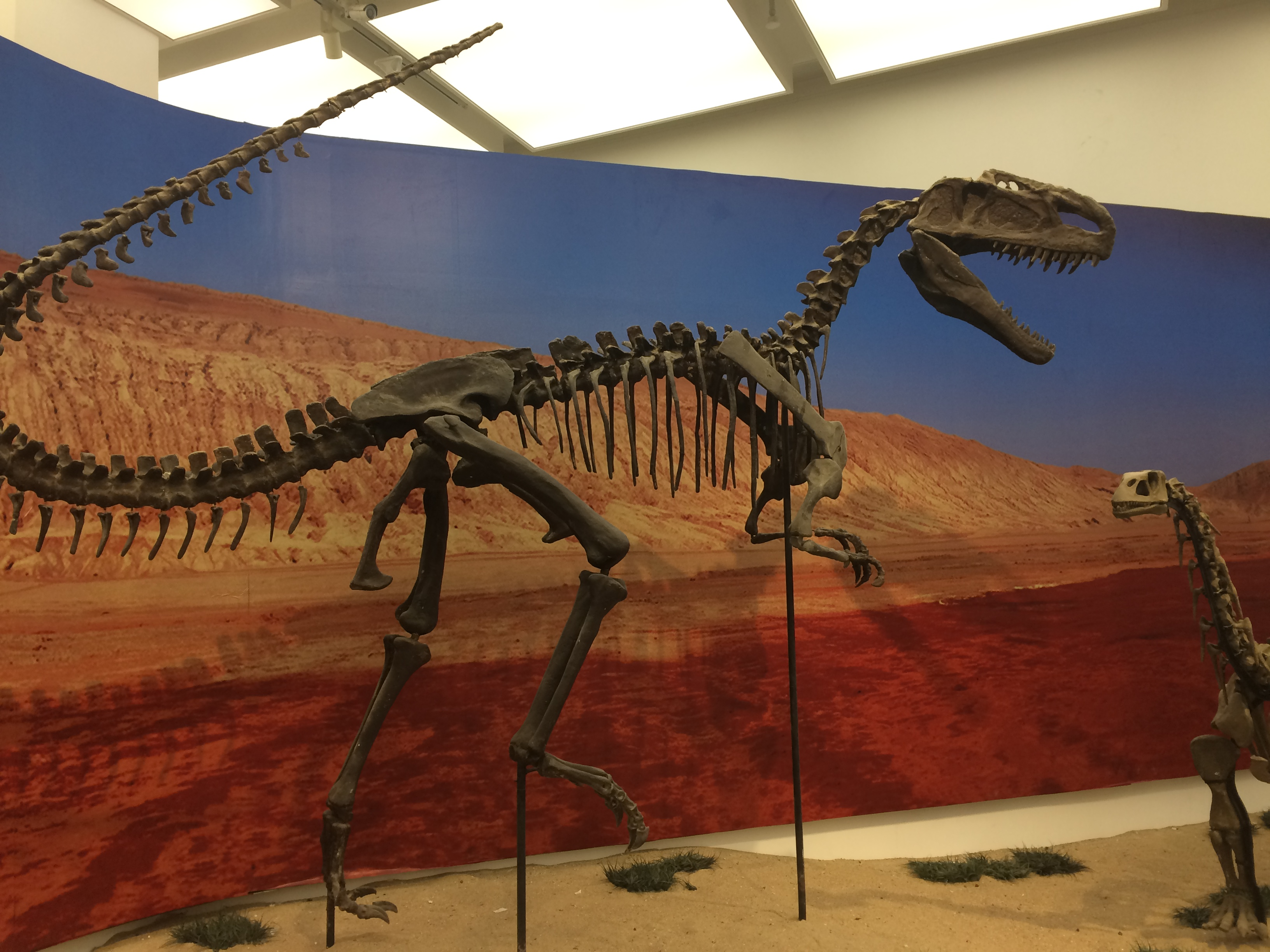
A Monolophosaurus attacking a Bellusaurus in a temporary Silk Road exhibit.
