= Ten =

Ten, TEN or 10 may refer to:

- 10, the even natural number following 9 and preceding 11
- one of the years 10 BC, AD 10, 1910, 2010, 2110
- October, the tenth month of the year

== Places ==
- Mount Ten, in Vietnam
- Tongren Fenghuang Airport (IATA code), China
- TEN Atlantic City, Casino hotel resort in New Jersey

== Transportation ==
- 10 (Los Angeles Railway), two streetcar lines in Los Angeles, California
- Line 10 (disambiguation), various metro lines
- Tatra 10, an Edwardian era automobile
- Rover 10, a small family car
- Sunbeam-Talbot Ten, originally Talbot Ten, a compact executive car
- ARO 10, also known as the Dacia 10, an off-road vehicle

== People and characters ==
- Shō Ten (1864–1920), the last crown prince of the Ryukyu Kingdom
- Tussenvoegsel prefix in Dutch surnames
- Denis Ten (1993–2018), Kazakhstani competitive figure skater and Olympic bronze medalist
- Jeremy Ten (born 1989), Canadian competitive figure skater
- Sergey Ten (born 1976), Russian politician
- Tyler Ten (born 1996), Singaporean actor
- Vicente Ten (born 1966), Spanish politician
- Ten Miyagi (born 2001), Japanese footballer
- Ten (Urusei Yatsura), a character from Urusei Yatsura
- Ten Yamasaki, (born 2005) Japanese singer, dancer, model, and actress
- Tenshinhan, nicknamed "Ten", a character from Dragon Ball
- Ten, a character in Mario & Luigi: Brothership
- The Tenth Doctor, often nicknamed "Ten", a character from Doctor Who
- Ten (鼬), a legendary Japanese marten yōkai (spirit from Japanese folklore) depicted in the Gazu Hyakki Yagyō by Sekien Toriyama

== Art and entertainment ==
=== Music ===
- Ten (singer), a Thai singer and member of South Korean boy group NCT
- Ten (band), a British melodic rock/hard rock band
- Tenuto or Ten., a direction in musical notation
- Ten, the runner-up contestant in the fourth season of the singing competition The Sing-Off
- TEN Music Group, a Swedish record label

==== Albums ====
- 10 (Enuff Z'nuff album), 2000
- #10 (The Guess Who album), 1973
- 10 (Hombres G album), 2007
- 10 (Kate Rusby album), 2002
- 10 (LL Cool J album), 2002
- 10 (New Kids on the Block album), 2013
- 10 (MercyMe album), 2009
- 10 (The Stranglers album), 1990
- 10 (Wet Wet Wet album), 1997
- 10 (Ginger album), 2010
- 10 (Hunter album), 2010
- 10 (John Anderson album), 1988
- 10 (The Piano Guys album), 2020
- 10 (Nikos Oikonomopoulos album), 2017
- 10 (Sault album), 2025
- 10 (Spice album), 2021
- Ten (Trooper album), 1991
- Ten (Brian McKnight album), 2006
- Ten (Clouddead album), 2004
- Ten (Gabriella Cilmi album), 2010
- Ten (Girls Aloud album), 2012
- Ten (Jason Moran album), 2010
- Ten (Pearl Jam album), 1991
- Ten (Ten album), 1996
- Ten (Y&T album), 1990
- 10 (mixtape), by Westside Gunn, 2022
- 10, an album by Liroy
- 10, an album by Johan Johansson
- Ten, an album by Clammbon
- 10, an album by Tarkan, 2017
- 10 (Alessandra Amoroso album), 2018

==== Songs ====
- "Ten" (song), a 2010 song by Jewel
- "Ten", a 2004 song by Monika Brodka
- "10", a 1998 song by Blonde Redhead from In an Expression of the Inexpressible
- "10", a song by Happy Diving

=== Film ===
- 10 (1979 film), an American romantic comedy
- Ten (2002 film), an Iranian docufiction film
- The Ten (film), a 2007 American anthology comedy film
- Ten (2013 film), a British action drama film
- Ten, a 2014 American action thriller film, retitled Sabotage
- Ten (2014 film), a thriller/horror film
- 10 (2022 film), an Indian sports film

=== Television ===
- Network 10, an Australian commercial television network
  - TEN (TV station), Network 10's flagship station in Sydney
  - 10 (Southern Cross Austereo), a Network 10 affiliate, owned by Southern Cross Austereo
  - NRN 10, a Network 10 affiliate in northern New South Wales
  - 10 (VoD service), a video-on-demand and catch-up TV service owned by Network 10, previously branded as 10Play
- The Erotic Network, an American pay-per-view service
- Sony Ten, an Indian pay TV sports network
- Channel Ten (Tanzania), a Tanzanian television channel
- 10 (miniseries), a 2010 Swiss series about a poker game
- "Ten", an episode of Men Behaving Badly
- News at Ten, a British news program broadcast on ITV

=== Literature ===
- Ten (manga), by Nobuyuki Fukumoto
- TEN: The Enthusiast Network, an American magazine publishing company

=== Other arts and entertainment ===
- The Ten or Ten American Painters, an 1897 artist group
- Total Entertainment Network, a mid-1990s online matchmaking service for PC video games

== Other uses ==
- Airwave Ten, an Austrian paraglider design
- Tennessee Titans, a National Football League team that uses this abbreviation for box scores and television scoring displays
- Then language or Ten, a language spoken in Guizhou, China
- Toxic epidermal necrolysis, also known as Lyell's Syndrome, a life-threatening dermatological condition
- Trans-European Networks, a 1992 group formed by the European Union for economic purposes
- Windows 10, an operating system
- ⑩, the Stenhaus-Moser number, also called megiston
- 10 Hygiea, an asteroid in the asteroid belt

== See also ==
- 010 (disambiguation)
- 10s, the decade from 1 Jan 10 AD to 31 Dec 19 AD
- Number 10 (disambiguation)
- Perfect 10 (disambiguation)
- Model 10 (disambiguation)
- Ten. (disambiguation)
- TENS (disambiguation)
- Tenten (disambiguation)
- The Ten (disambiguation)
- X (disambiguation)
- TEN Group (disambiguation)
- Ten Brothers (disambiguation)
- 1O (disambiguation) (the digit "1" and the letter "O")
