= Jianguodaoyifengqu station =

Metro station in Tianjin, China

Jianguodaoyifengqu 建国道意风区
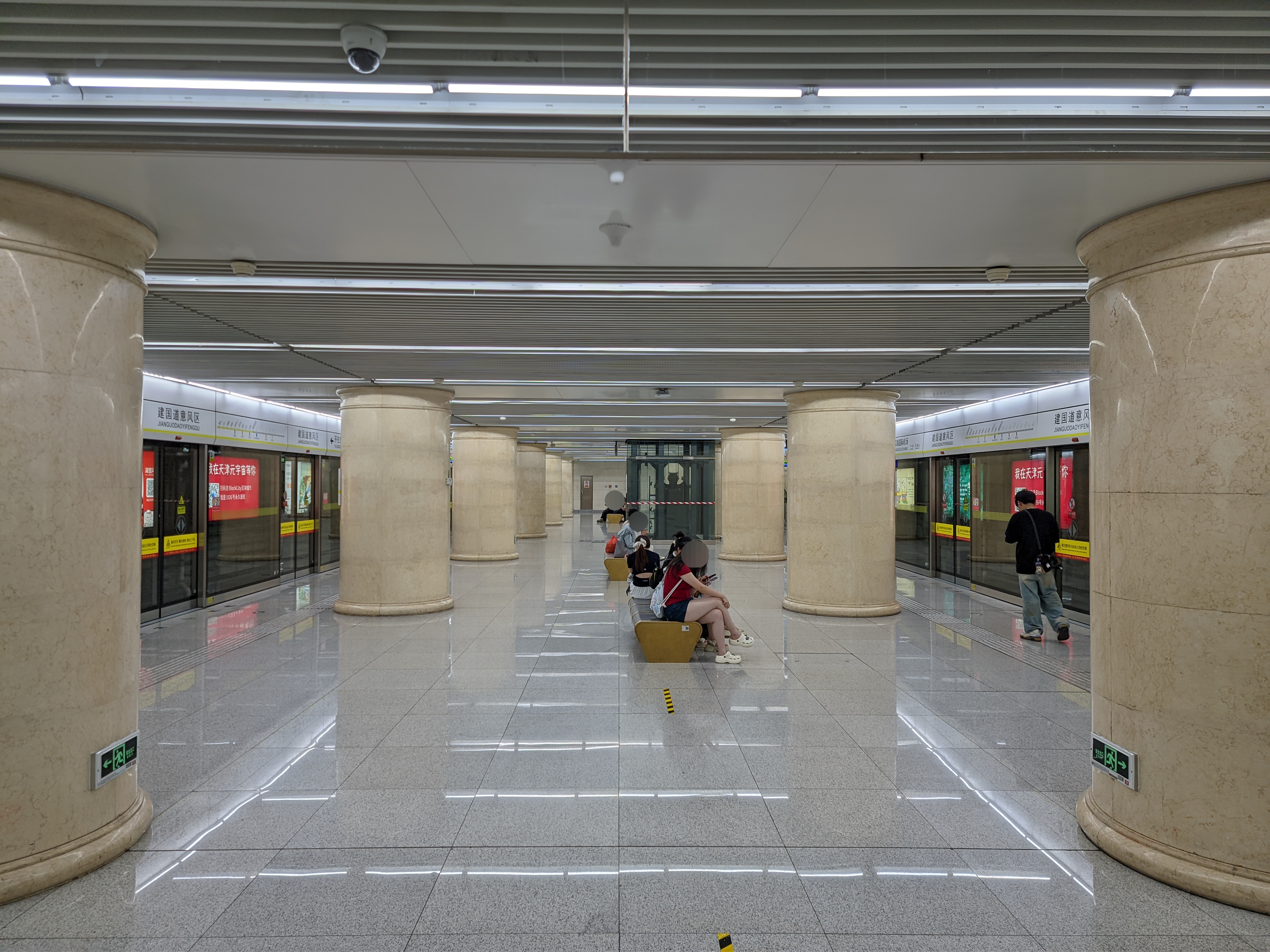

General information
- Other names: Jianguodao (before September 2024)
- Location: Hebei District, Tianjin; China
- Coordinates: 39.1379°N 117.1948°E
- Operator: Tianjin Metro Co. Ltd.
- Line: Line 2

Construction
- Structure type: Underground

History
- Opened: 28 August 2013

Services
Preceding station	Tianjin Metro	Following station
Dongnanjiao towards Caozhuang	Line 2	Tianjinzhan towards Binhaiguojijichang
Location

Jianguodaoyifengqu station (Chinese: 建国道意风区站; pinyin: Jiànguódàoyìfēngqū zhàn; lit. 'Jianguo Road·Italian Style Area station') is a station of Line 2 of the Tianjin Metro. It started operations on 28 August 2013. The station renamed from Jianguodao station (Chinese: 建国道站; pinyin: Jiànguódào zhàn) to Jianguodaoyifengqu station on 28 September 2024.
