= Dongnanjiao station =

Metro station in Tianjin, China

Coordinates: 39.1357°N 117.1841°E

Dongnanjiao 东南角
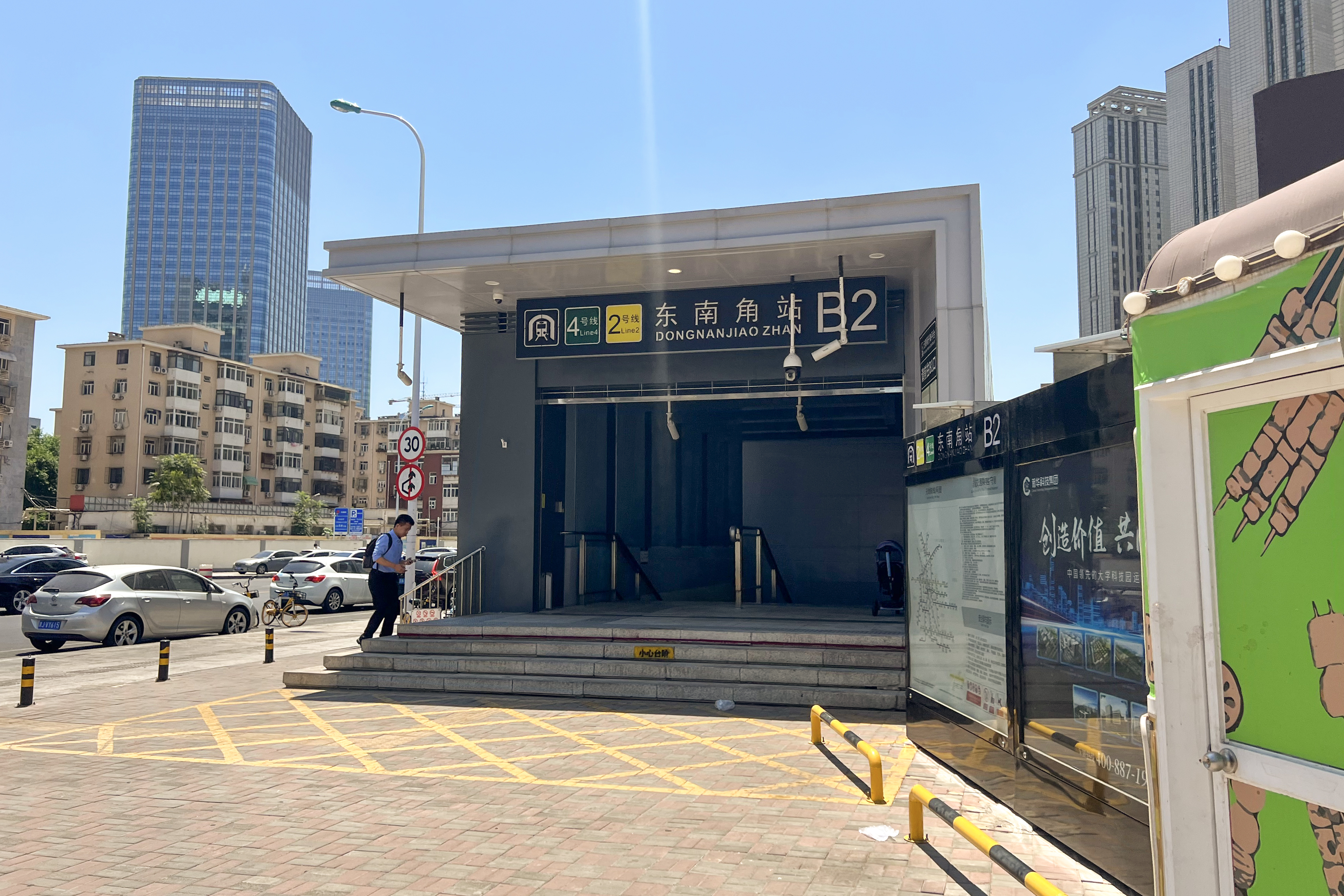
- Entrance B2

General information
- Location: Nankai District, Tianjin; China
- Operator: Tianjin Metro Co. Ltd.
- Lines: Line 2 Line 4

Construction
- Structure type: Underground

History
- Opened: 1 July 2012 (Line 2); 28 December 2021 (Line 4)

Services
Preceding station	Tianjin Metro	Following station
Gulou towards Caozhuang	Line 2	Jianguodaoyifengqu towards Binhaiguojijichang
Terminus	Line 4	Jinjie towards Xinxingcun
Location

Dongnanjiao station (Chinese: 东南角站) is a station of Line 2 and Line 4 of the Tianjin Metro. It started operations on 1 July 2012.
