= Changhonggongyuan station =

Metro station in Tianjin, China

Changhonggongyuan 长虹公园
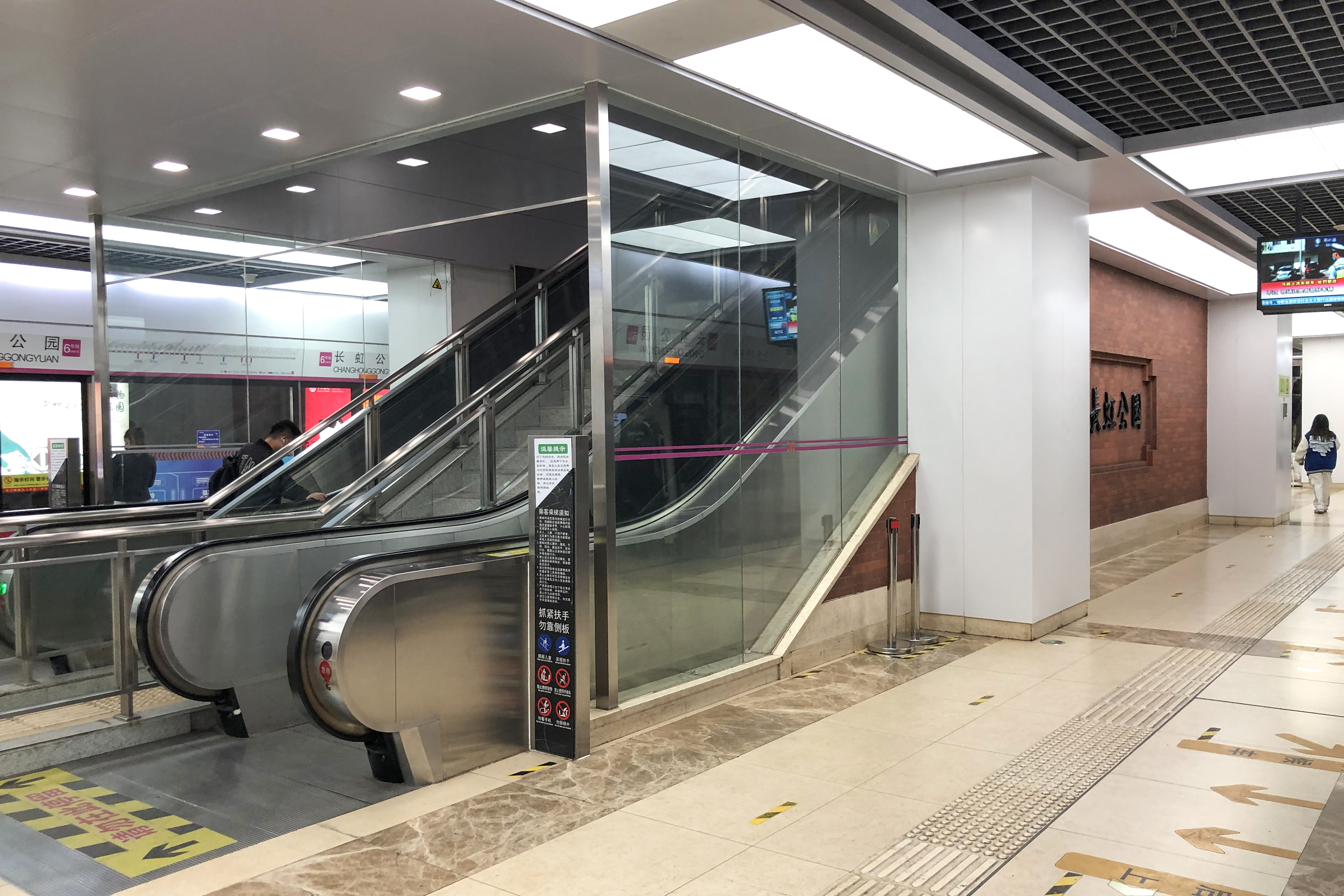
- Line 6 platform

General information
- Other names: Changhong Park
- Location: Nankai District, Tianjin; China
- Coordinates: 39.13632°N 117.14309°E
- Operated by: Tianjin Metro Co. Ltd.
- Lines: Line 2; Line 6

Construction
- Structure type: Underground

History
- Opened: 1 July 2012 (Line 2); 6 August 2016 (Line 6)

Services
Preceding station	Tianjin Metro	Following station
Xianyanglu towards Caozhuang	Line 2	Guangkaisimalu towards Binhaiguojijichang
Reminyiyuan towards Nansunzhuang	Line 6	Yibindao towards Lushuidao
Location

Changhonggongyuan station (Chinese: 长虹公园站; lit. 'Changhong Park station') is a station of Line 2 and Line 6 western section of the Tianjin Metro. It started operations on 1 July 2012.

== Description ==
Changhonggongyuan Station is a three-story underground station. Located on the basement level, the station hall has a subway customer service center, which can provide passengers manual ticket purchase, recharge of subway stored-value cards, and lost and found services. In addition, self-service facilities such as ticket vending machines, ticket inspection machines, and ATMs are also available in the station hall. The line 2 platform is located on the second basement. It is an island platform. The line 6 platform is located on the third floor of the basement. It is an island platform too.
