= Gulou station (Tianjin Metro) =

Metro station in Tianjin, China

Gulou 鼓楼
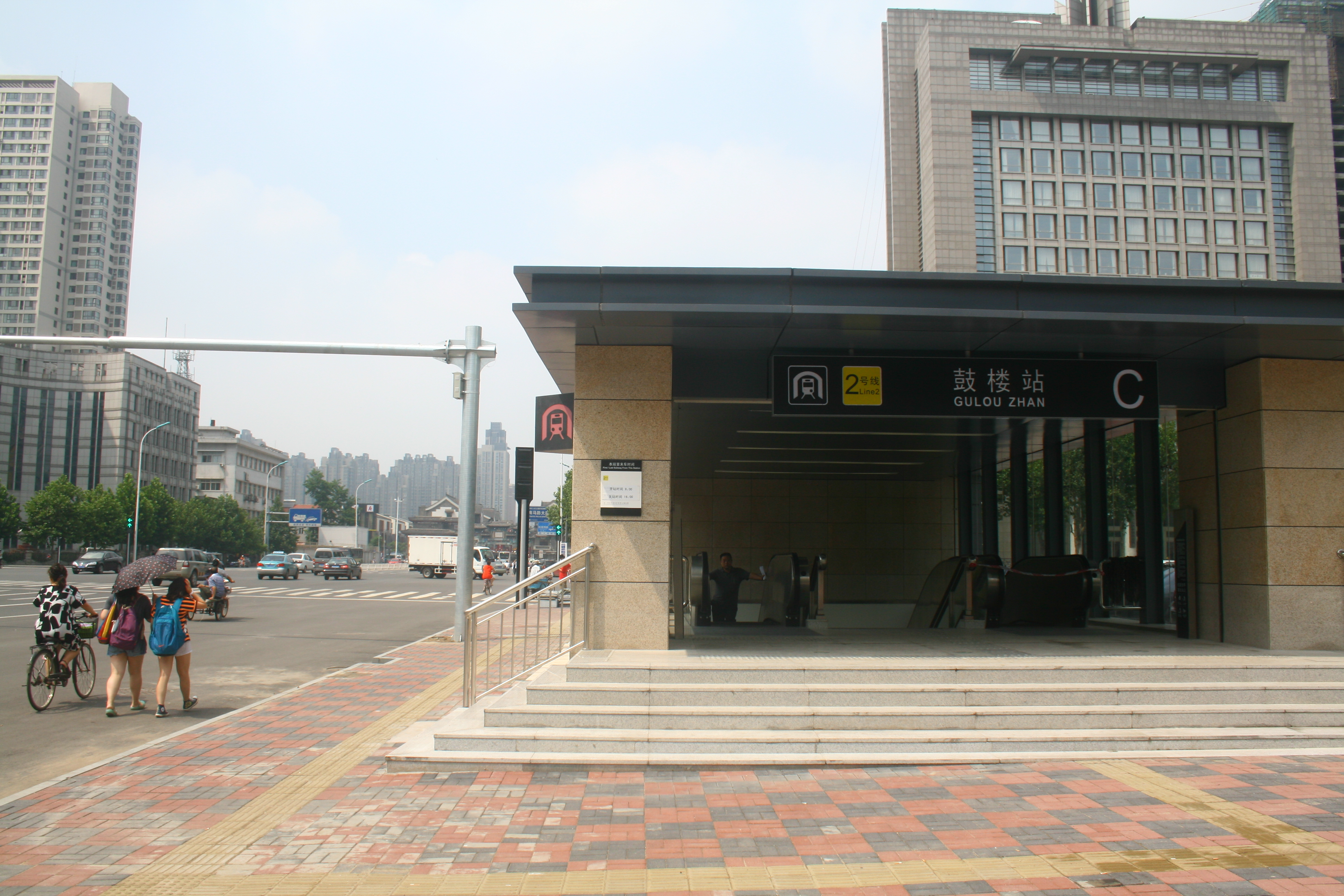

General information
- Location: Nankai District, Tianjin; China
- Operator: Tianjin Metro Co. Ltd.
- Lines: Line 2 Line 7

Construction
- Structure type: Underground

History
- Opened: 1 July 2012 (Line 2); 28 September 2025 (Line 7)

Services
Preceding station	Tianjin Metro	Following station
Xi'nanjiao towards Caozhuang	Line 2	Dongnanjiao towards Binhaiguojijichang
Terminus	Line 7	Fuandajie towards Saidalu
Location

Gulou Station (Chinese: 鼓楼站) is a station of Line 2 and Line 7 of the Tianjin Metro. It started operations on 1 July 2012.
