= Jieyuanxidao station =

Metro station in Tianjin, China

Jieyuanxidao 芥园西道
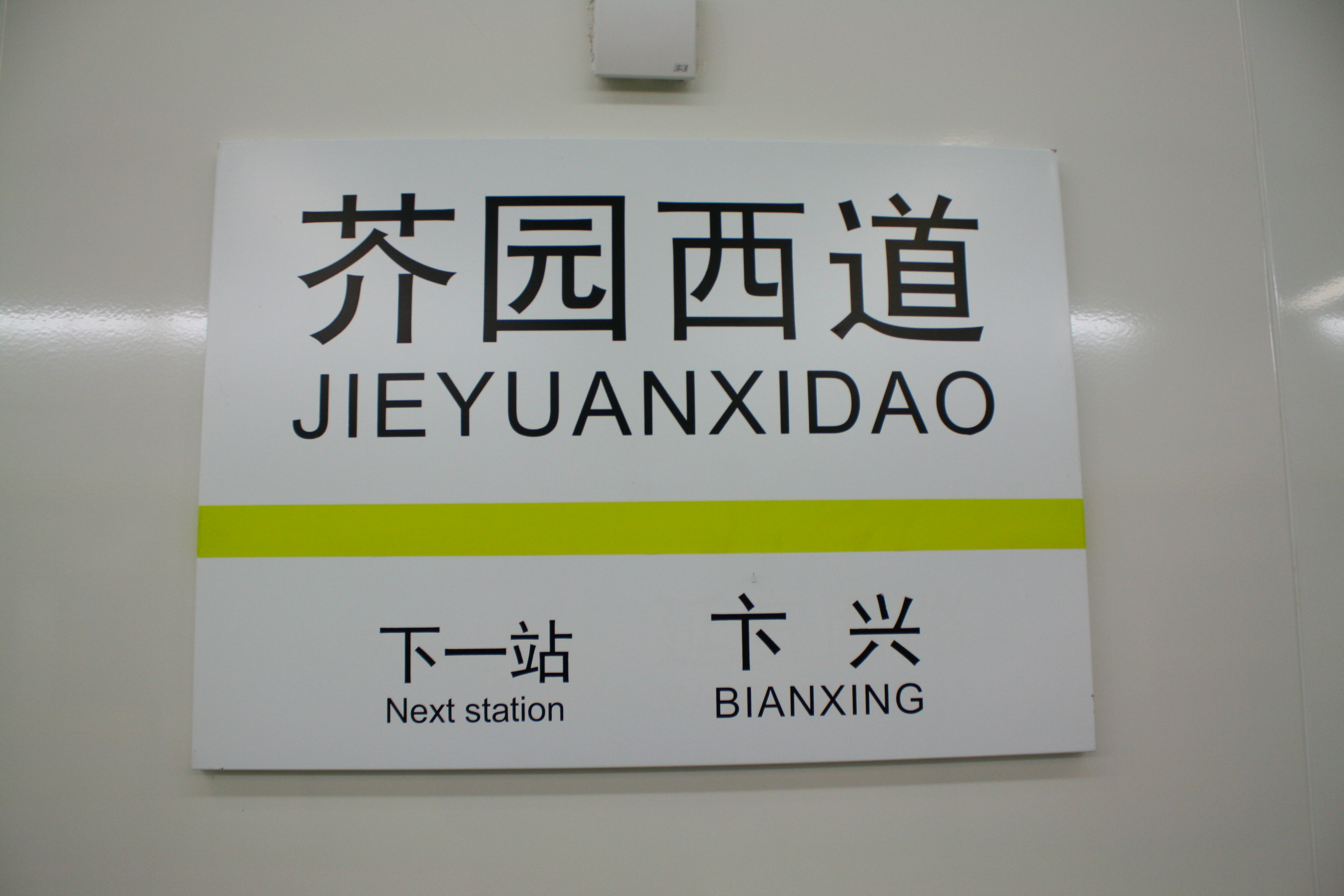

General information
- Location: Nankai District, Tianjin; China
- Coordinates: 39.1411°N 117.1136°E
- Operated by: Tianjin Metro Co. Ltd.
- Line: Line 2

Construction
- Structure type: Underground

History
- Opened: 1 July 2012

Services
Preceding station	Tianjin Metro	Following station
Bianxing towards Caozhuang	Line 2	Xianyanglu towards Binhaiguojijichang
Location

Jieyuanxidao Station (Chinese: 芥园西道) is a station of Line 2 western section of the Tianjin Metro.

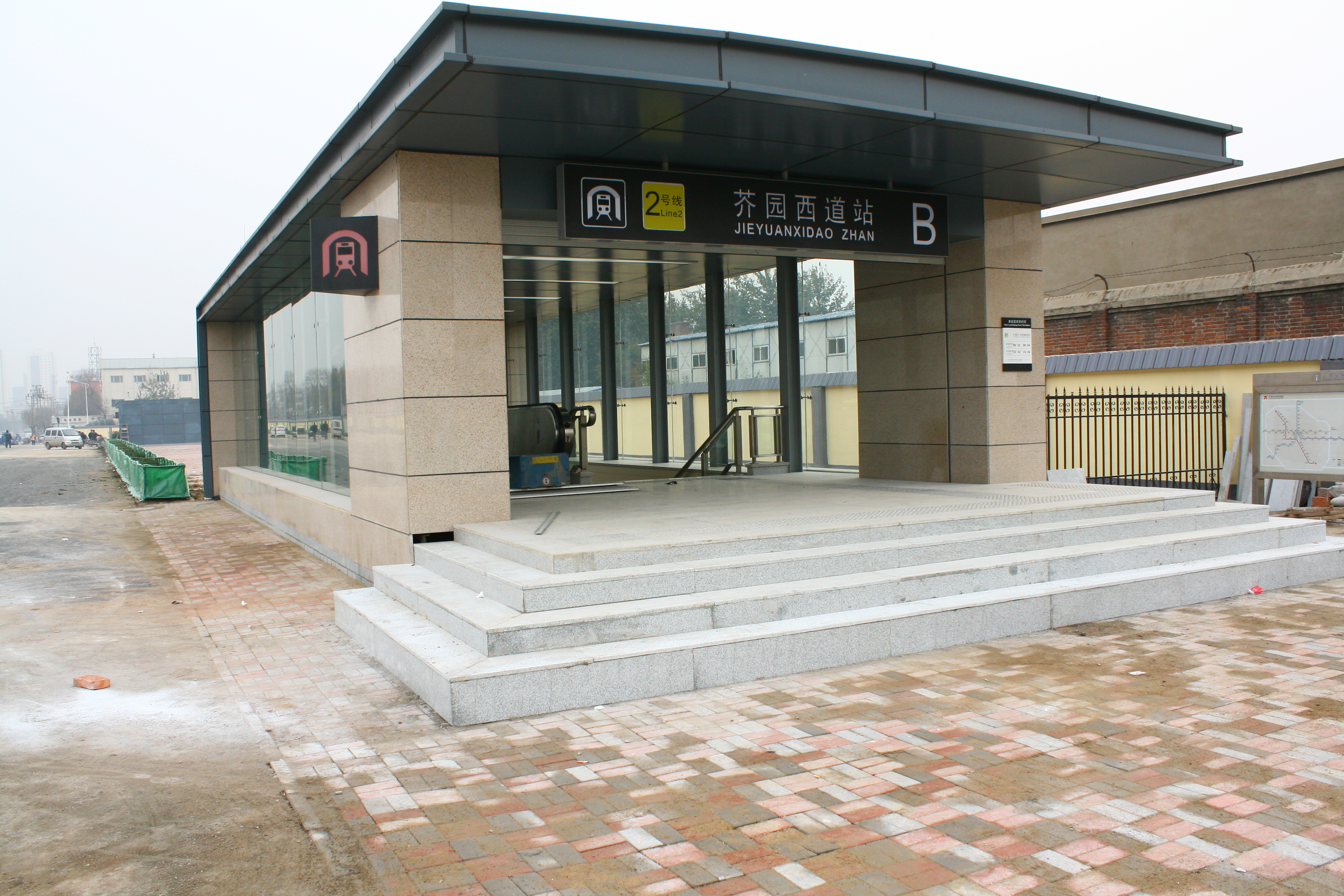
Exit B

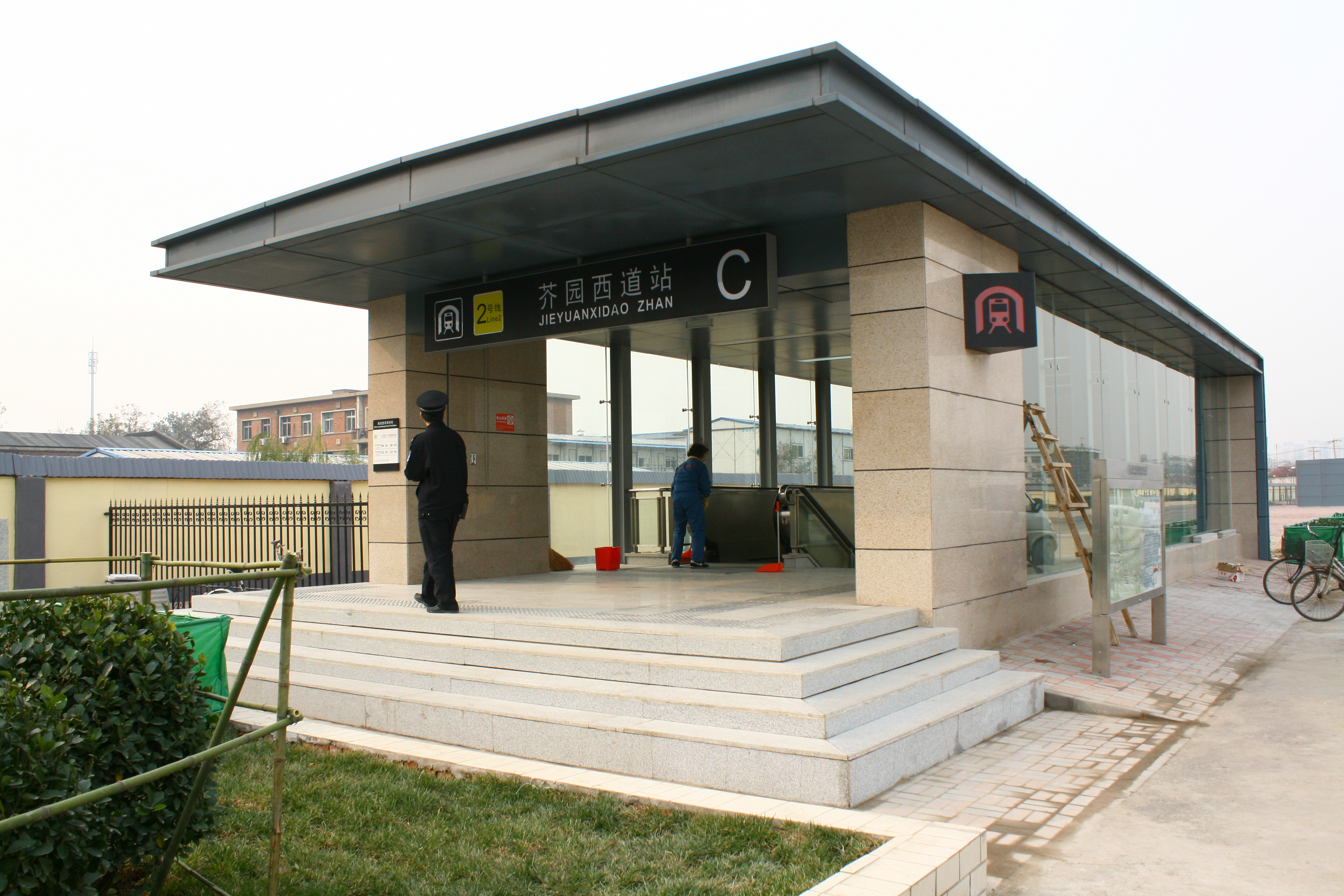
Exit C
