= Shunchiqiao station =

Metro station in Tianjin, China

Shunchiqiao 顺驰桥
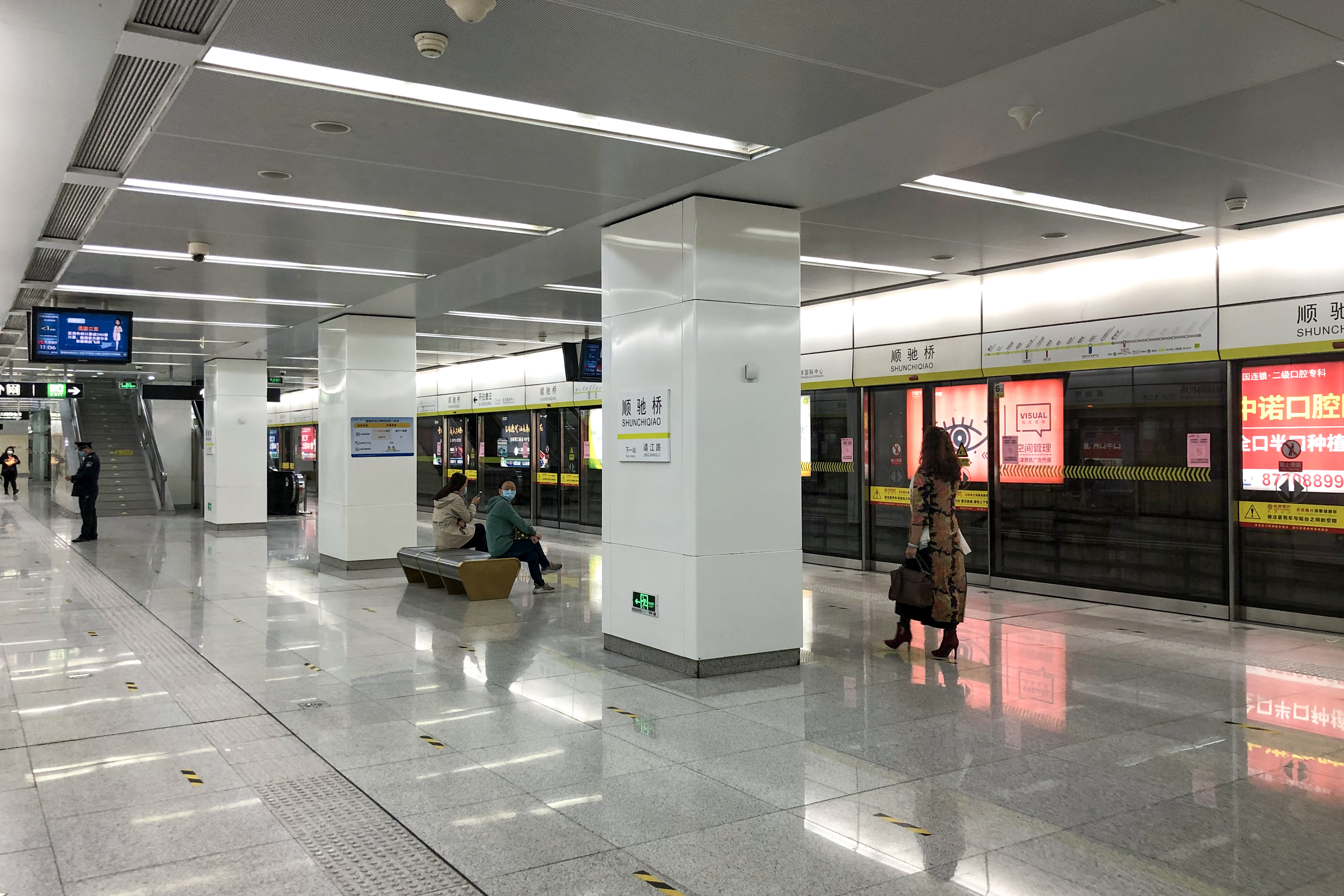

General information
- Location: Hedong District, Tianjin; China
- Operator: Tianjin Metro Co. Ltd.
- Line: Line 2

Construction
- Structure type: Underground

History
- Opened: 1 July 2012

Services
Preceding station	Tianjin Metro	Following station
Yuanyangguojizhongxin towards Caozhuang	Line 2	Jingjianglu towards Binhaiguojijichang
Location

Shunchiqiao Station (Chinese: 顺驰桥站) is a Line 2 western section station of the Tianjin Metro. It started operations on 1 July 2012.
