= Jingjianglu station =

Metro station in Tianjin, China

Jingjianglu 靖江路
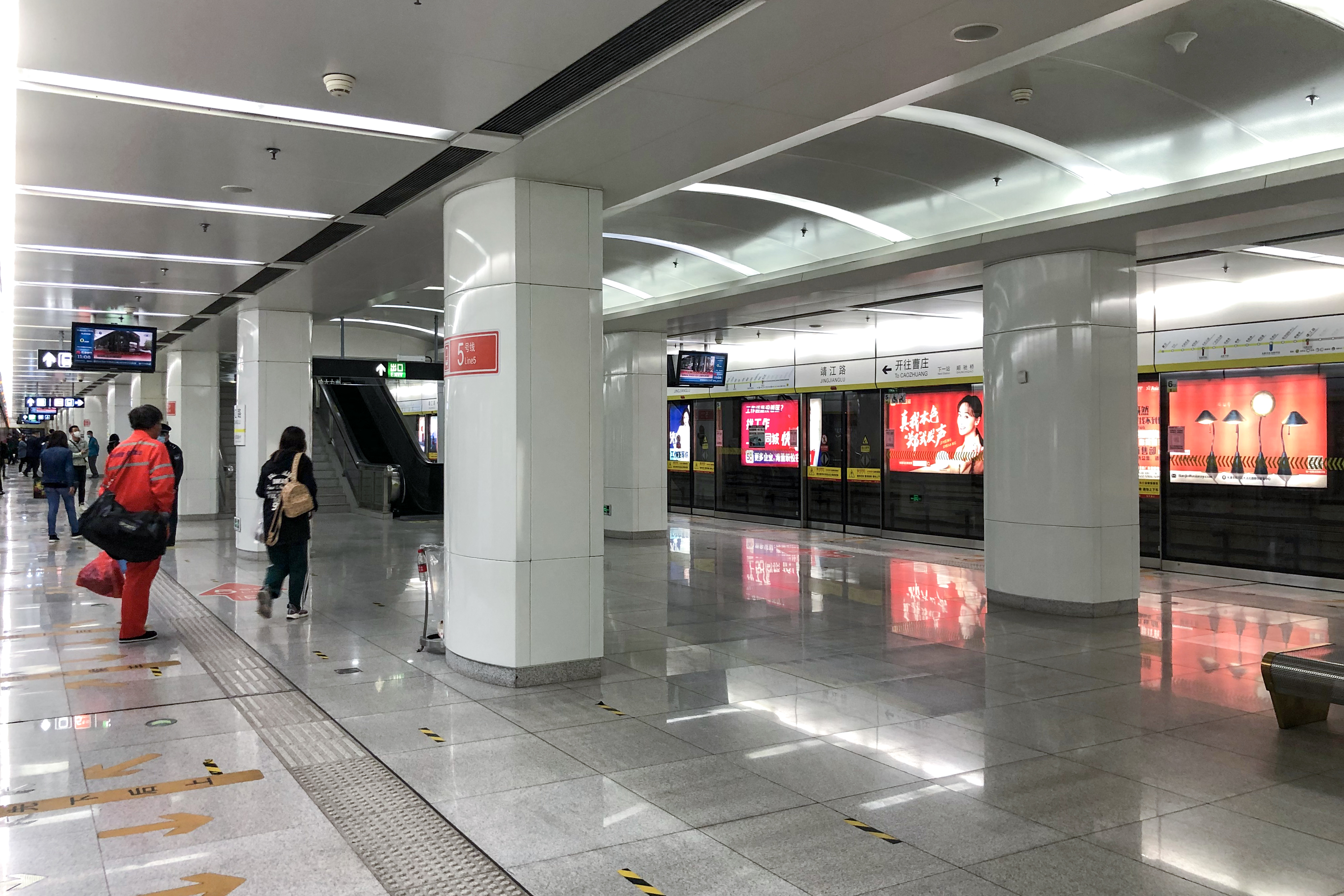
- Line 2 platform

General information
- Other names: Jingjiang Road
- Location: Hedong District, Tianjin; China
- Operator: Tianjin Metro Co. Ltd.
- Lines: Line 2 Line 5

Construction
- Structure type: Underground

History
- Opened: 1 July 2012 (Line 2); 22 October 2018 (Line 5)

Services
Preceding station	Tianjin Metro	Following station
Shunchiqiao towards Caozhuang	Line 2	Cuifuxincun towards Binhaiguojijichang
Xingfugongyuan towards Beichenkejiyuanbei	Line 5	Chenglindao towards Jinghuadongdao
Location

Jingjianglu station (Chinese: 靖江路站; lit. 'Jingjiang Road station') is a station of Line 2 and Line 5 of the Tianjin Metro. It started operations on 1 July 2012.
