= Yuanyangguojizhongxin station =

Metro station in Tianjin, China

Yuanyangguojizhongxin 远洋国际中心
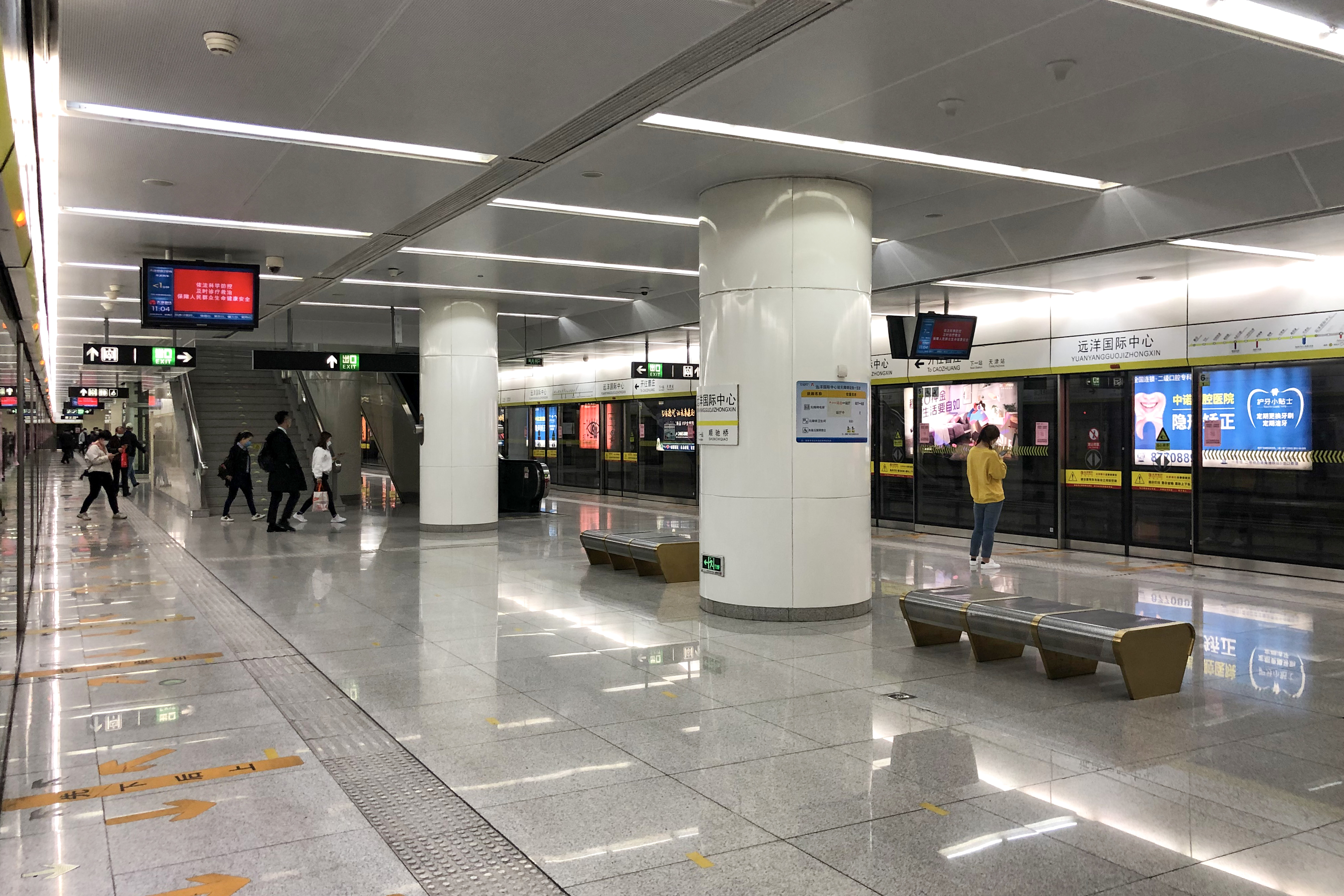

General information
- Other names: Sino-Ocean International Center
- Location: Hedong District, Tianjin; China
- Coordinates: 39.1357°N 117.2157°E
- Operator: Tianjin Metro Co. Ltd.
- Line: Line 2

Construction
- Structure type: Underground

History
- Opened: 1 July 2012

Services
| Preceding station | Tianjin Metro | Following station |
|---|---|---|
| Tianjinzhan towards Caozhuang | Line 2 | Shunchiqiao towards Binhaiguojijichang |
Location

Yuanyangguojizhongxin station (Chinese: 远洋国际中心站; pinyin: Yuǎnyáng Guójì Zhōngxīn zhàn; lit. 'Sino-Ocean International Center station') is a station of Line 2 western section of the Tianjin Metro. It started operations on 1 July 2012.
