= Guoshanlu station =

Metro station in Tianjin, China

Guoshanlu 国山路
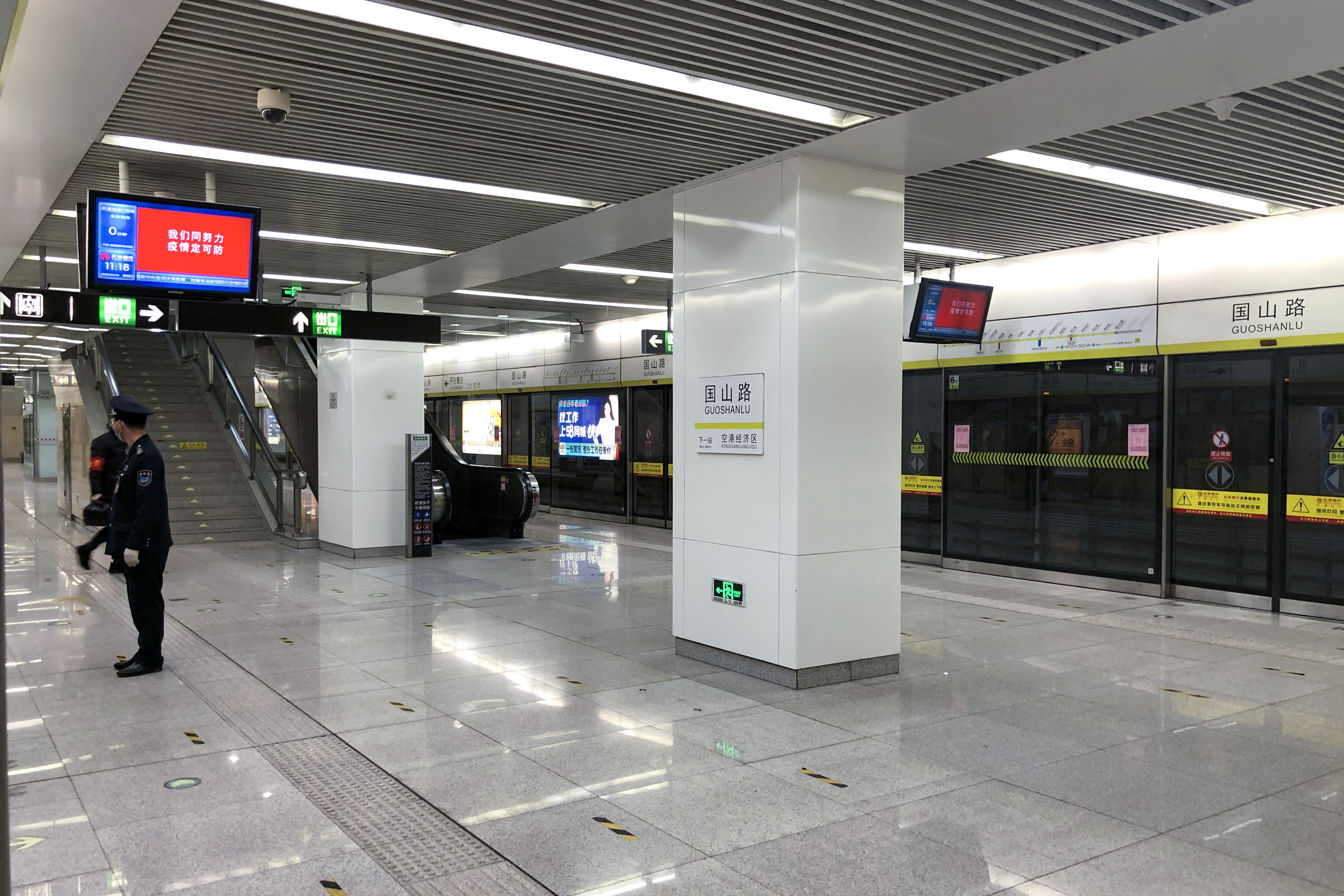

General information
- Other names: Guoshan Road
- Location: Dongli District, Tianjin; China
- Operator: Tianjin Metro Co. Ltd.
- Line: Line 2

Construction
- Structure type: Underground

History
- Opened: 1 July 2012

Services
Preceding station	Tianjin Metro	Following station
Dengzhoulu towards Caozhuang	Line 2	Konggangjingjiqu towards Binhaiguojijichang
Location

Guoshanlu Station (Chinese: 国山路站), literally Guoshan Road Station in English, is a station of Line 2 western section of the Tianjin Metro. It started operations on 1 July 2012.
