= Xianyanglu station =

Metro station in Tianjin, China

Xianyanglu 咸阳路
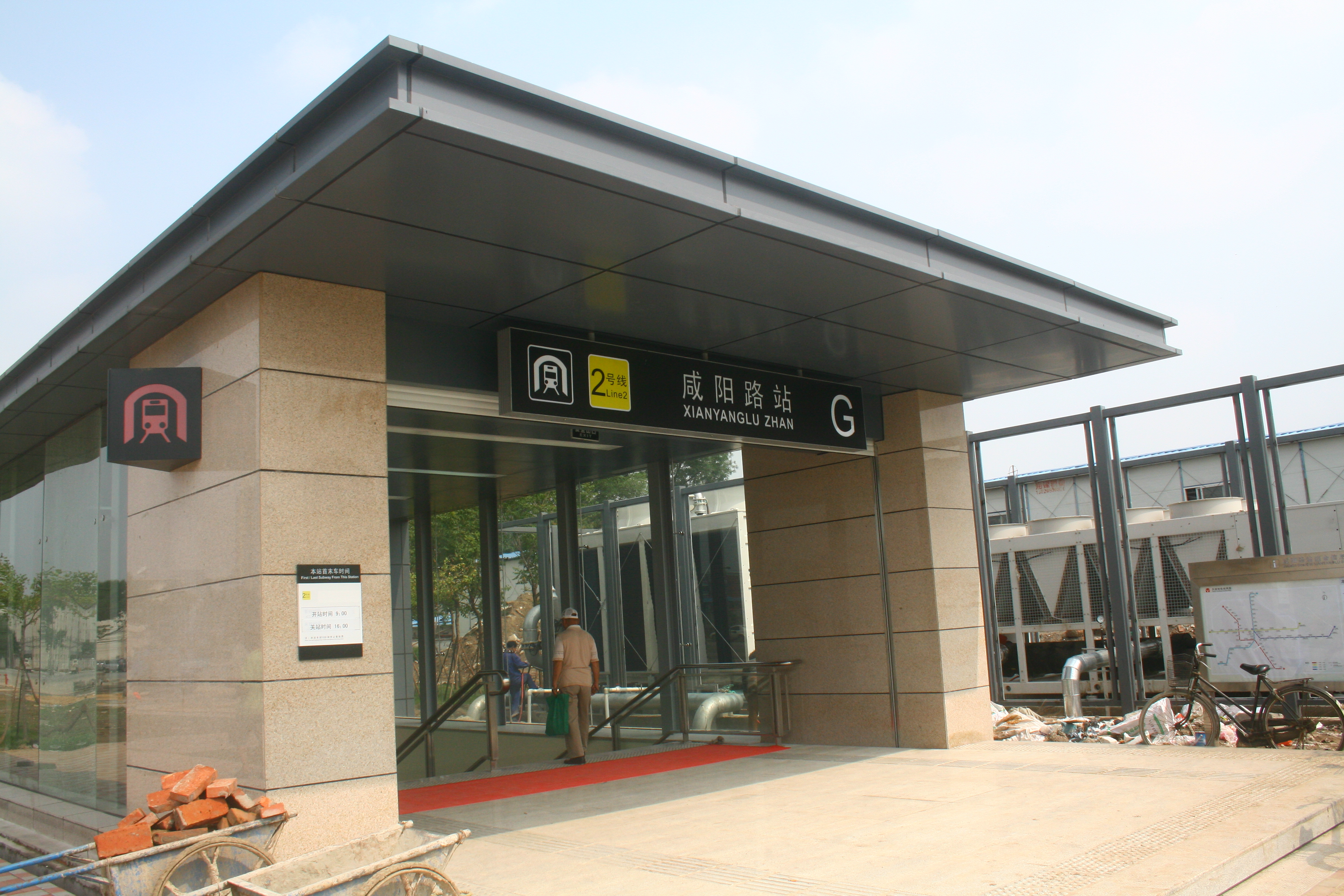

General information
- Other names: Xianyang Road
- Location: Nankai District, Tianjin; China
- Coordinates: 39.1364781°N 117.1291249°E
- Operator: Tianjin Metro Co. Ltd.
- Line: Line 2

Construction
- Structure type: Underground

History
- Opened: 1 July 2012

Services
| Preceding station | Tianjin Metro | Following station |
|---|---|---|
| Jieyuanxidao towards Caozhuang | Line 2 | Changhonggongyuan towards Binhaiguojijichang |
Location

Xianyanglu Station (Chinese: 咸阳路站), literally Xianyang Road Station in English, is a station of Line 2 western section of the Tianjin Metro. It started operations on 1 July 2012.
