= Dengzhoulu station =

Metro station in Tianjin, China

Dengzhoulu 登州路
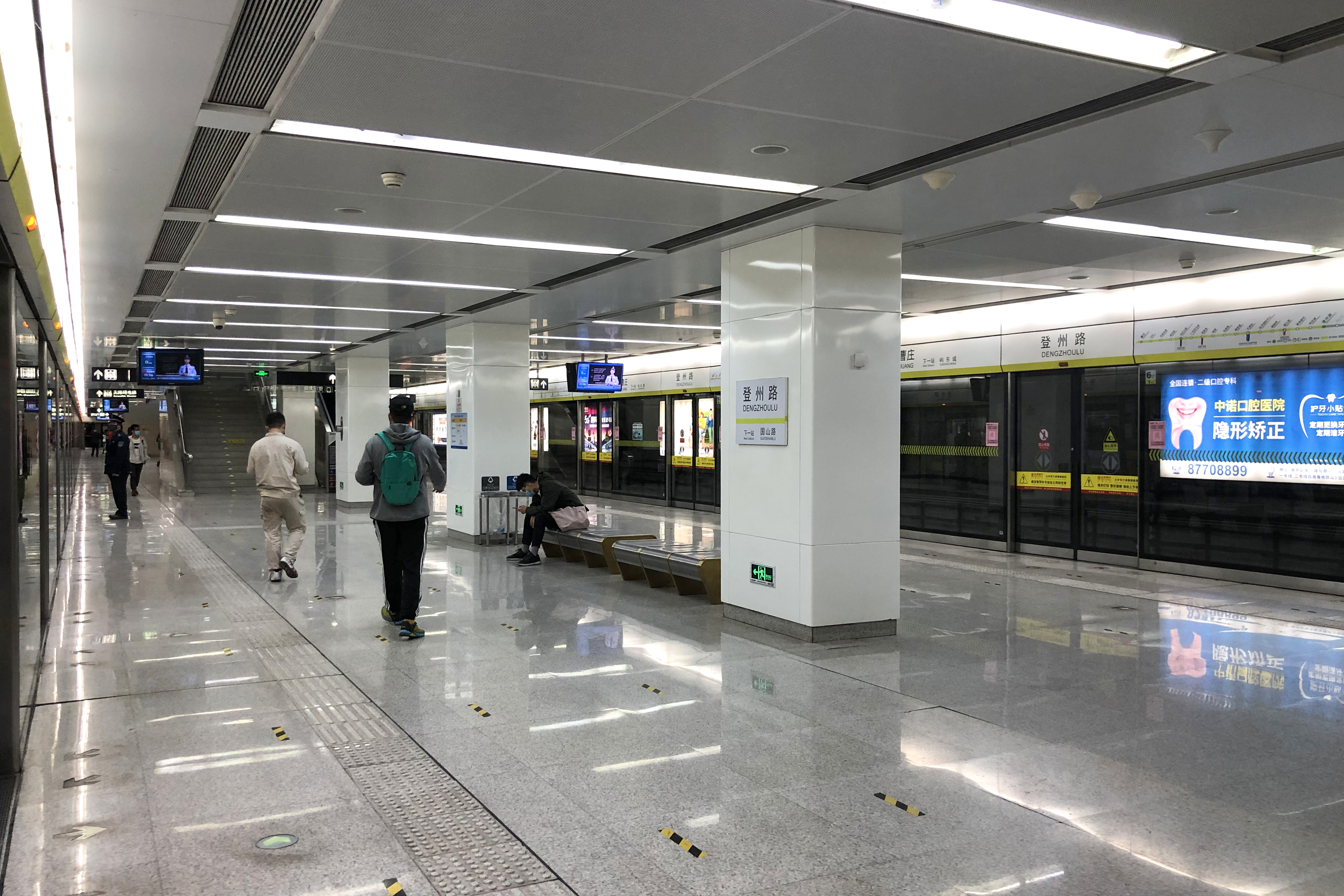

General information
- Other names: Dengzhou Road
- Location: Dongli District, Tianjin; China
- Coordinates: 39.1501°N 117.2904°E
- Operator: Tianjin Metro Co. Ltd.
- Line: Line 2

Construction
- Structure type: Underground

History
- Opened: 1 July 2012

Services
Preceding station	Tianjin Metro	Following station
Yudongcheng towards Caozhuang	Line 2	Guoshanlu towards Binhaiguojijichang
Location

Dengzhoulu Station (Chinese: 登州路站), literally Dengzhou Road Station in English, is a station of Line 2 western section of the Tianjin Metro. It started operations on 1 July 2012.
