= Guangkaisimalu station =

Metro station in Tianjin, China

Guangkaisimalu 广开四马路
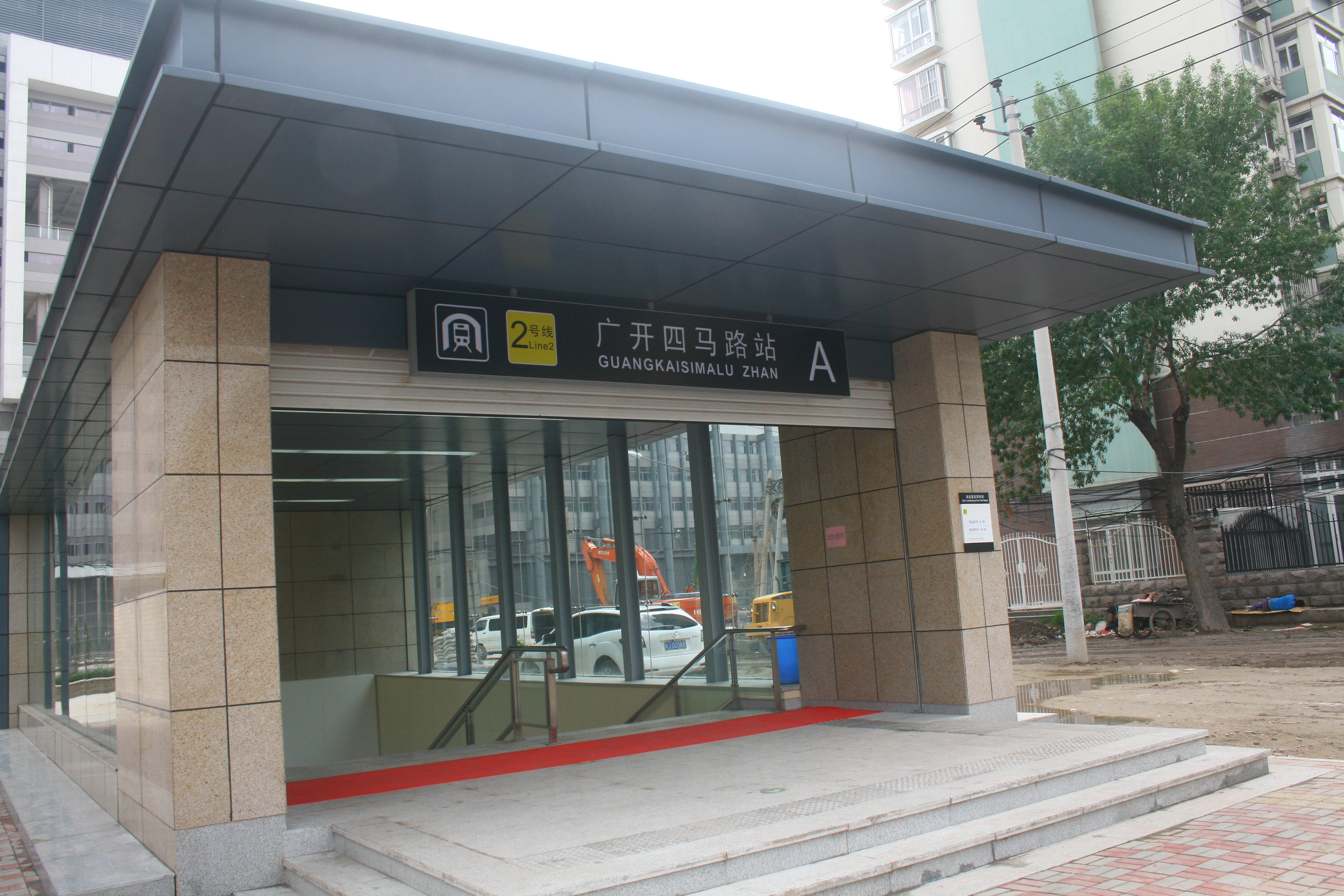

General information
- Other names: Guangkai Fourth Road
- Location: Nankai District, Tianjin; China
- Operator: Tianjin Metro Co. Ltd.
- Line: Line 2

Construction
- Structure type: Underground

History
- Opened: 1 July 2012

Services
| Preceding station | Tianjin Metro | Following station |
|---|---|---|
| Changhonggongyuan towards Caozhuang | Line 2 | Xi'nanjiao towards Binhaiguojijichang |
Location

Guangkaisimalu station (Chinese: 广开四马路站; lit. 'Guangkai Fourth Road station'), is a station on the western section of line 2 on the Tianjin Metro in Nankai District, Tianjin City, China. It began operations on 1 July 2012.
