= Cuifuxincun station =

Metro station in Tianjin, China

Cuifuxincun 翠阜新村
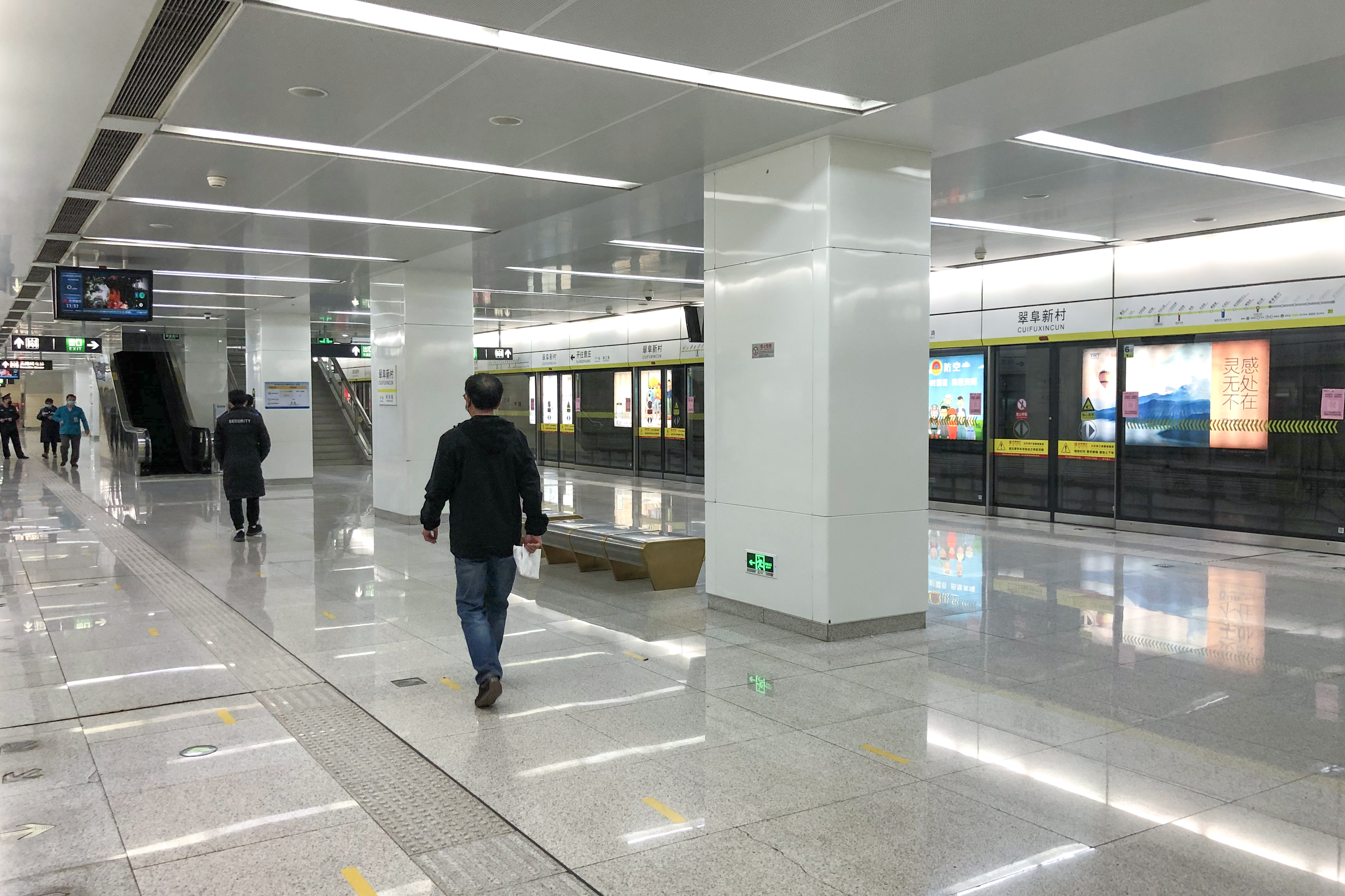

General information
- Location: Hedong District, Tianjin; China
- Coordinates: 39.14313°N 117.25082°E
- Operator: Tianjin Metro Co. Ltd.
- Line: Line 2

Construction
- Structure type: Underground

History
- Opened: 1 July 2012

Services
Preceding station	Tianjin Metro	Following station
Jingjianglu towards Caozhuang	Line 2	Yudongcheng towards Binhaiguojijichang
Location

Cuifuxincun Station (Chinese: 翠阜新村站) is a station of Line 2 western section of the Tianjin Metro in Tianjin, China. It started operations on 1 July 2012.
