= Konggangjingjiqu station =

Metro station in Tianjin, China

Konggangjingjiqu 空港经济区
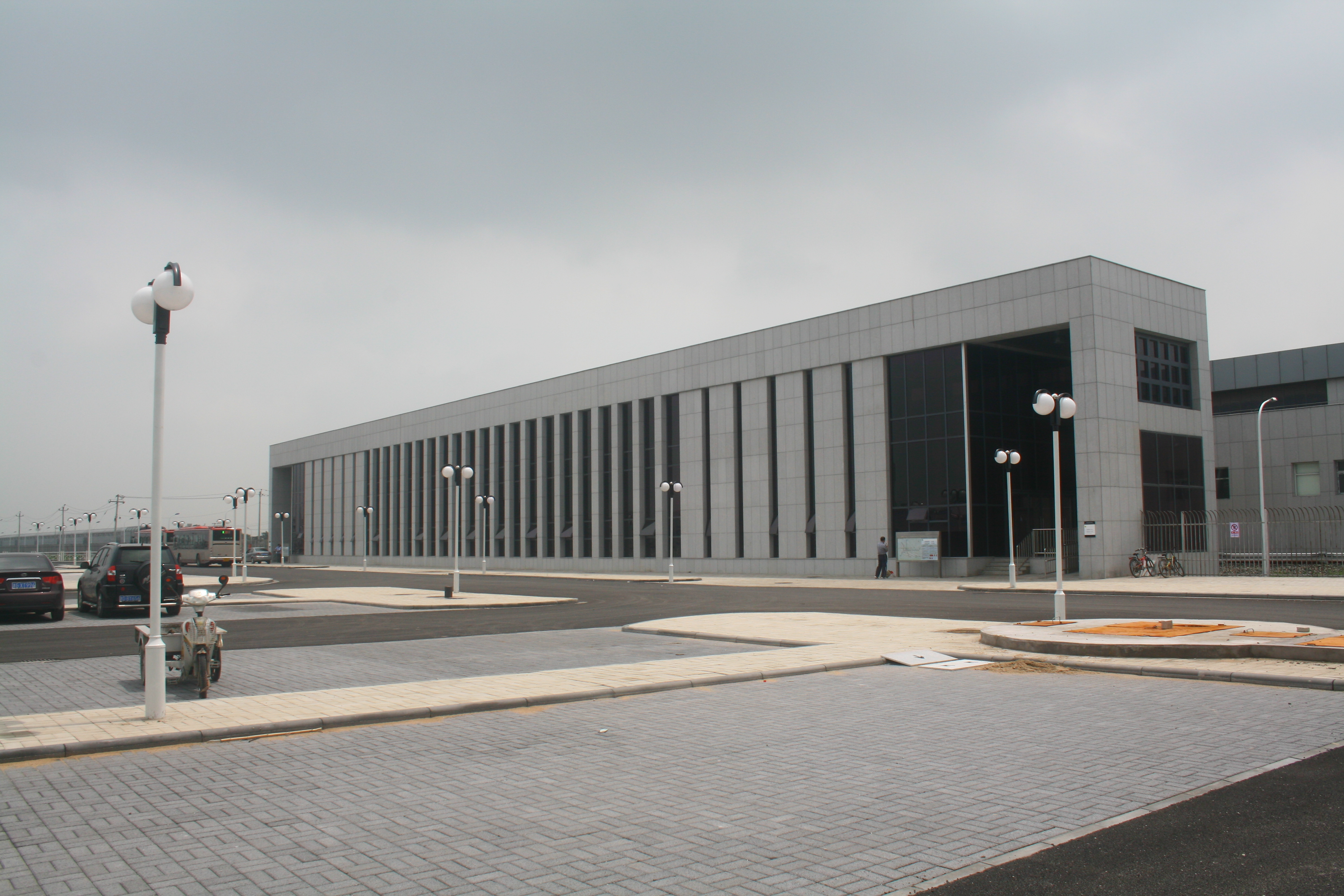

General information
- Other names: Airport Economic Zone
- Location: Dongli District, Tianjin; China
- Operator: Tianjin Metro Co. Ltd.
- Line: Line 2

Construction
- Structure type: Underground

History
- Opened: 1 July 2012

Services
Preceding station	Tianjin Metro	Following station
Guoshanlu towards Caozhuang	Line 2	Binhaiguojijichang Terminus
Location

Konggangjingjiqu Station (Chinese: 空港经济区站; pinyin: Kōnggǎng Jīngjì Qū zhàn; lit. 'Airport Economic Zone station') is a station of Line 2 of the Tianjin Metro. It started operations on 1 July 2012.
