= Yudongcheng station =

Metro station in Tianjin, China

Yudongcheng 屿东城
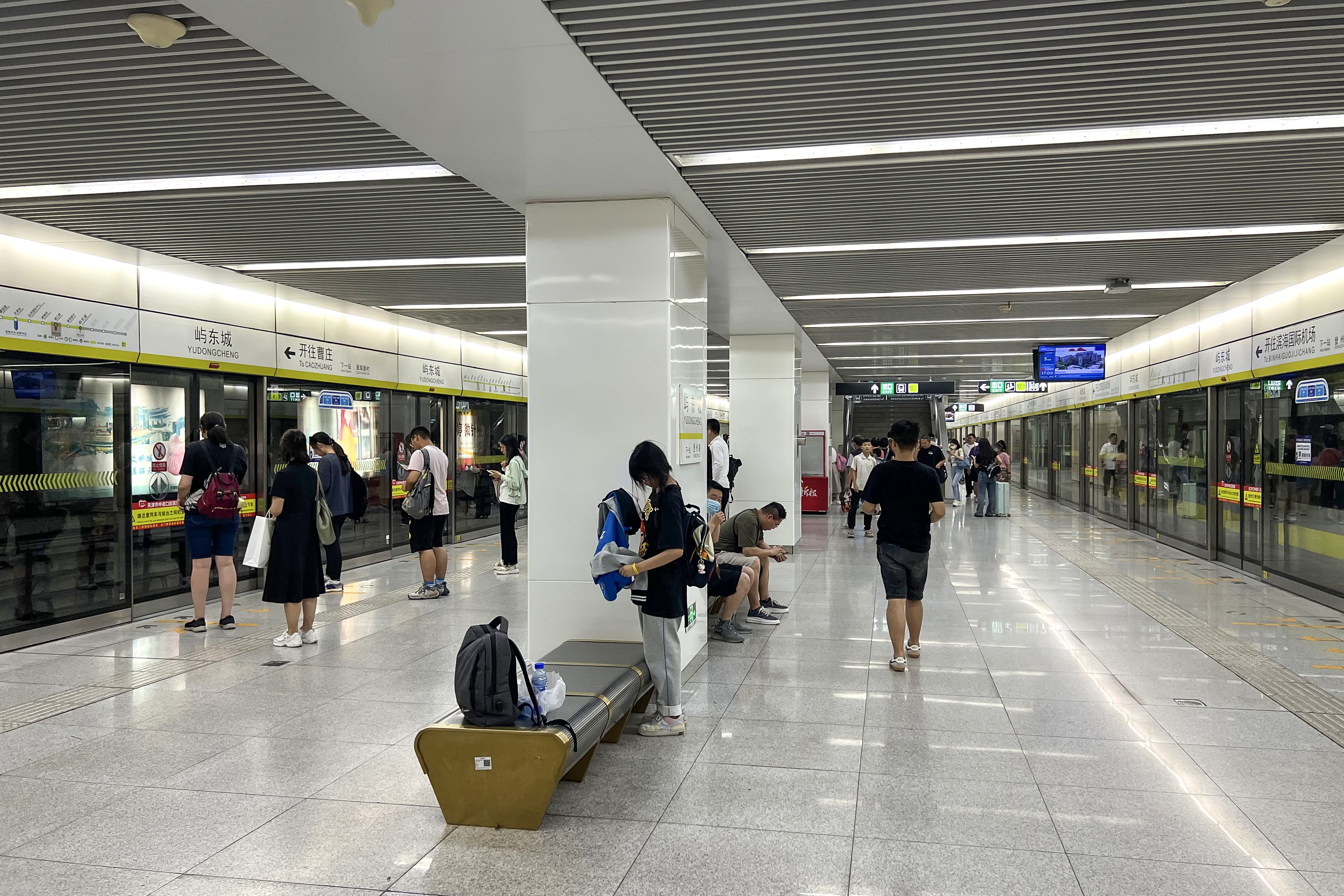
- Line 2 platform

General information
- Location: Dongli District, Tianjin; China
- Coordinates: 39.1464°N 117.2736°E
- Operated by: Tianjin Metro Co. Ltd.
- Lines: Line 2 Line 10

Construction
- Structure type: Underground

History
- Opened: 1 July 2012 (Line 2); 18 November 2022 (Line 10)

Services
Preceding station	Tianjin Metro	Following station
Cuifuxincun towards Caozhuang	Line 2	Dengzhoulu towards Binhaiguojijichang
Laoshandao towards Yutai	Line 10	Terminus
Location

Yudongcheng station (Chinese: 屿东城站; pinyin: Yǔdōngchéng zhàn) is a station of Line 2 and Line 10 of the Tianjin Metro. It started operations on 1 July 2012.
