= Ten10 =

Ten10 or TEN10 may refer to:

- Ten10 cricket, a cricket format
- TEN (TV station), Sydney, Australia, operated by Network 10
- Ten10 (album), a 2018 album by British rapper Chip

== See also ==
- October 10
- 1010 (disambiguation)
- 10x10 (disambiguation)
- 10 (disambiguation)
