= Route 10 =

Route 10 may refer to:

- One of several highways - see List of highways numbered 10
- One of several public transport routes - see List of public transport routes numbered 10
