= Caijingdaxue station =

Metro station in Tianjin, China

Caijingdaxue 财经大学
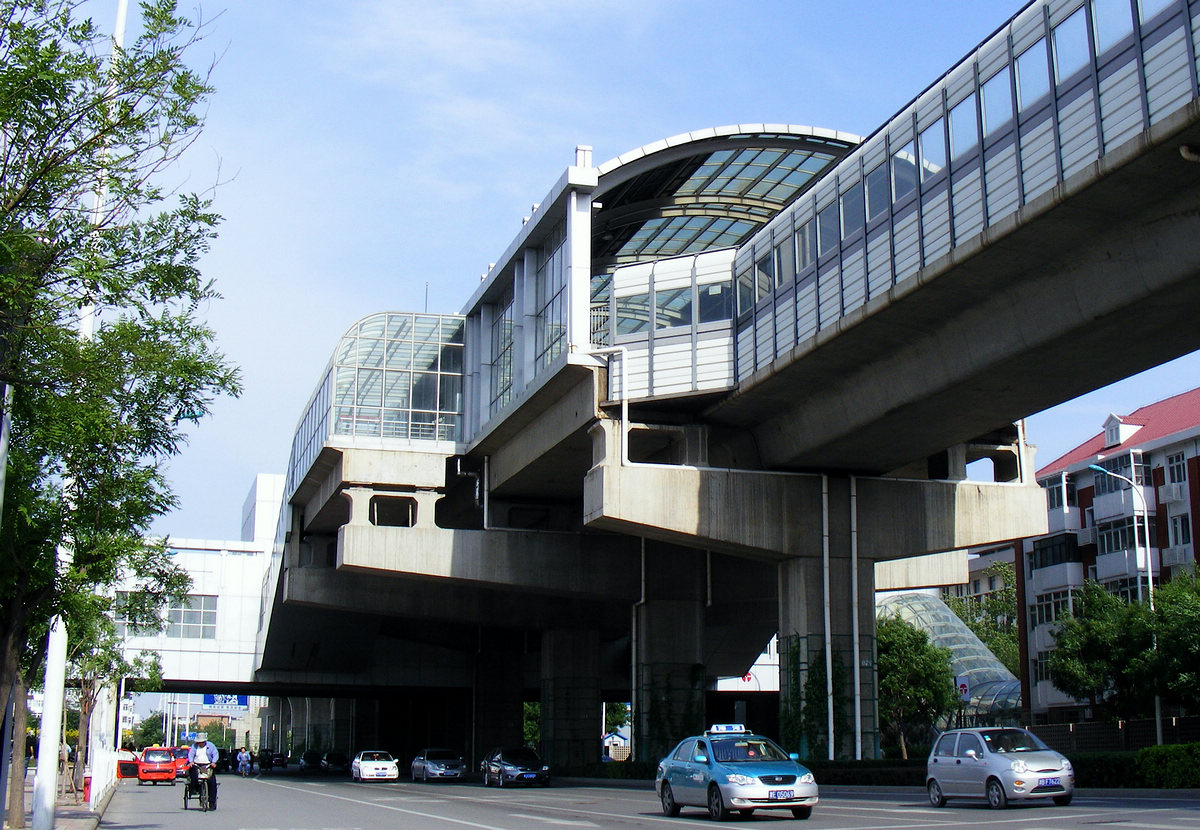

General information
- Location: Hexi District, Tianjin; China
- Coordinates: 39°03′46″N 117°16′15″E
- Operated by: Tianjin Metro
- Lines: Line 1 Line 10
- Platforms: 2

History
- Opened: 12 June 2006 (Line 1); 18 November 2022 (Line 10)

Services
| Preceding station | Tianjin Metro | Following station |
|---|---|---|
| Shuanglin towards Shuangqiaohe | Line 1 | Huashanli towards Liuyuan |
| Weishanlu towards Yutai | Line 10 | Liulinlu towards Yudongcheng |
Location

Caijingdaxue station (Chinese: 财经大学站; pinyin: Cáijīngdàxué zhàn; lit. 'University of Finance & Economics station') is a metro station located in Hexi District, Tianjin, China, adjacent to the main campus of the Tianjin University of Finance & Economics (TUFE). It is a station on the Line 1 and Line 10 of the Tianjin Metro. The station for Line 1 is elevated and the station for Line 10 is underground.

== Station configuration ==
Caijingdaxue station of Line 1 is an elevated station located on the median strip in the middle of Zhujiang Avenue. The station for Line 10 is located underground.

=== Concourse level ===
The concourse is located on the level 1. The passengers must check-in through ticket barriers before being allowed to enter the platforms. The station information centre can provide essential services, including ticket sales (including refills) and Lost and Found services. In addition, the station hall also has ticket vending machine, automatic teller machines and other self-service facilities.

=== Platforms ===
The platforms are arranged in side platform configuration, each 3.5 metres wide. The platforms have platform screen doors (PSDs).

=== Station exits ===
Caijingdaxue Station has four exits, all of which are located on either side of Zhujiang Avenue. A and B are located on the north side and C and D on the south. The exits are linked to the main structure station via two connecting bridges which span across the road. Elevators are available. The respective exits and the nearby facilities and attractions are listed below:

- Exit A - Fengzhi Li (风致里), Jingzhi Li (景致里), Yazhi Li (雅致里) (all residential units)
- Exit B - Tianjin University of Finance & Economics (天津财经大学), Statistics Vocational Secondary School (统计职业中专学校), Huanghai Li (黄海里)
- Exit C - Tianjin University of Finance & Economics (天津财经大学)
- Exit D - Tianjin University of Finance & Economics (天津财经大学), Zhencai Li (振财里)

== Transport links ==
=== Buses ===
- No. 97, 631, 662, 656, 665, 676, 686, 695, 823, 846, 859, etc.
