= Bianxing station =

Metro station in Tianjin, China

Bianxing 卞兴
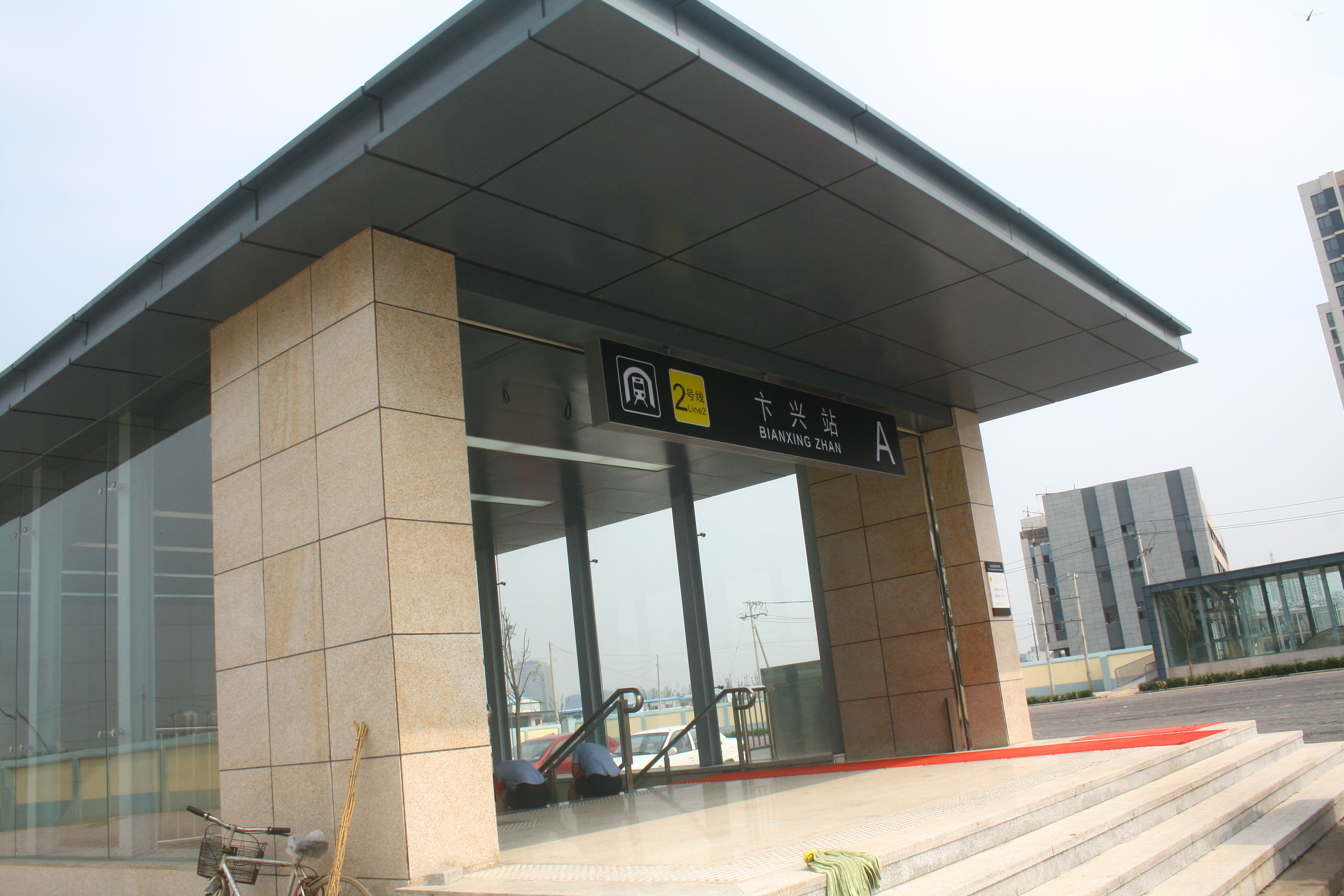

General information
- Location: Nankai District, Tianjin; China
- Coordinates: 39.1450°N 117.1030°E
- Operator: Tianjin Metro Co. Ltd.
- Line: Line 2

Construction
- Structure type: Underground

History
- Opened: 1 July 2012

Services
Preceding station	Tianjin Metro	Following station
Caozhuang Terminus	Line 2	Jieyuanxidao towards Binhaiguojijichang
Location

Bianxing Station (Chinese: 卞兴站) is a station of Line 2 western section of the Tianjin Metro. It started operations on 1 July 2012.
