= The Ten =

The Ten or The 10 may refer to:

- The Ten (film), the 2007 American film
- The TEN, an international athletics meeting and 10,000 m race
- The Ten American Painters, an American Impressionist artists' group active during the late 19th and early 20th centuries, not to be confused with a later group (below) by the same name
- The Ten (Expressionists), an American artists' group active during the 1930s, not to be confused with an earlier group (above) by the same name
- The 10 (novel), a Greek novel
- The 10 (TV series), a Greek TV series
- Interstate 10 in California, commonly referred to as "the 10" by people from Southern California
- The 10: A Memoir of Family and the Open Road, a book by E. A. Hanks

== See also ==
- Ten (disambiguation)
