= Tenten =

Tenten may refer to:

- dotstokyo, a former Japanese idol group
- Tenten, a character in Naruto media
- Ford Ten-Ten, a Ford Motor Company vehicle
- Ten-ten or dakuten, a diacritic sign in Japanese writing
- The Japanese title of Adrift in Tokyo, a 2007 movie
- Tenten Koganei, an antagonist in Sumomomo Momomo
- TenTen Corpus Family – set of comparable text corpora
- Tenten Producing Team, a group of KPOP composers from Cube Entertainment
- Tintin (character)'s name in Turkish is "Tenten"
- Takashi Tezuka, a Japanese game designer also known as "Ten Ten"

== See also ==
- 1010 (disambiguation)
- 10:10, the climate change campaign
