= Line 7 (Tianjin Metro) =

Metro line in Tianjin, China

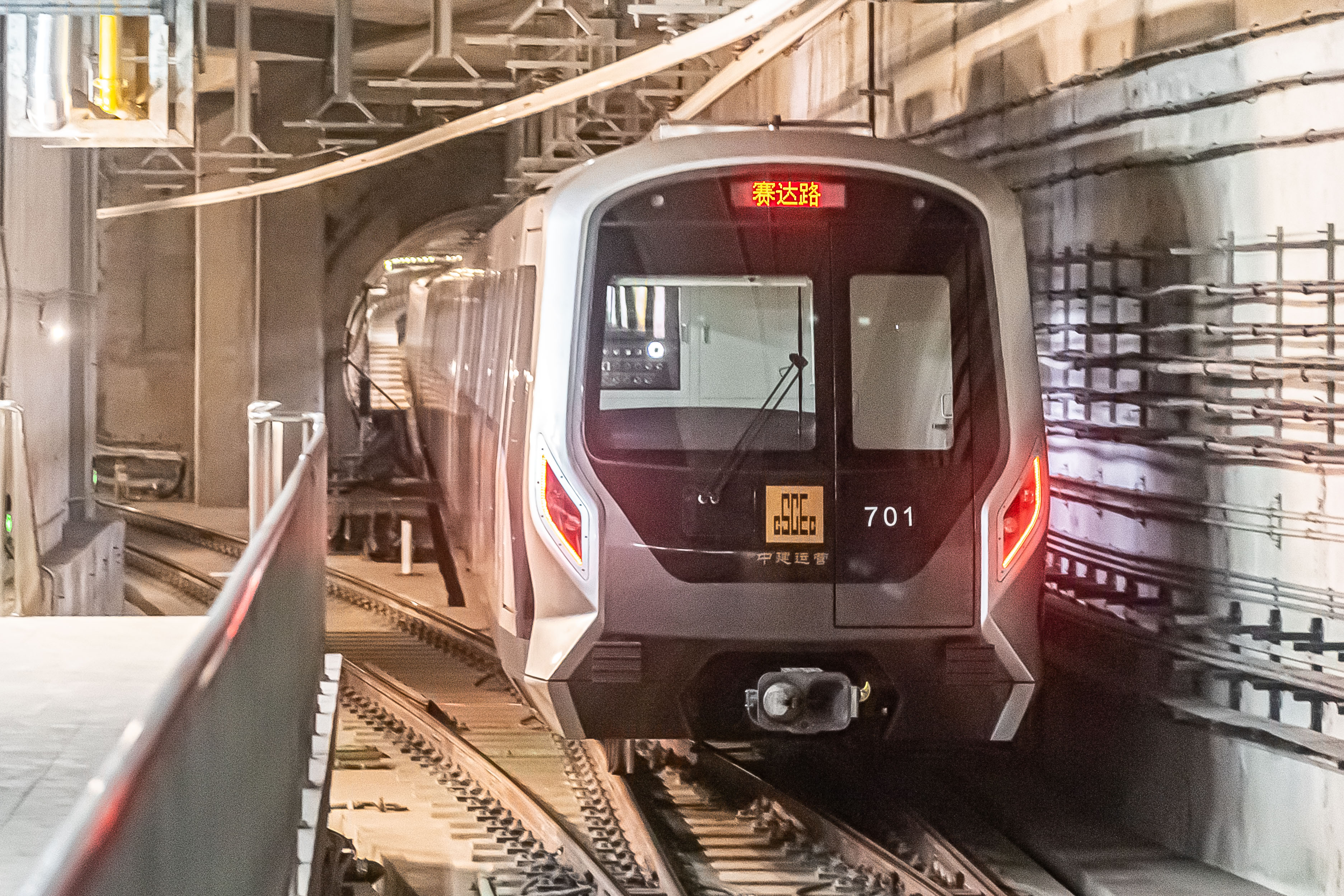
- Line 7 train leaving Gulou station

Overview
- Status: Operational
- Owner: CREC (Tianjin) Rail Transport Investment & Construction Co., Ltd.
- Locale: Tianjin, China
- Termini: Saidalu; Gulou
- Stations: 15

Service
- Type: Rapid transit
- System: Tianjin Metro
- Operator(s): CREC (Tianjin) Rail Transport Investment & Construction Co., Ltd.
- Rolling stock: 6-car type A

History
- Opened: 28 September 2025; 13 months ago

Technical
- Line length: 21.82 km (13.56 mi)
- Num of tracks: 2
- Track gauge: 1,435 mm (4 ft 8 1/2 in)
- Electrification: 1,500 V DC Overhead catenary
- Operating speed: 80 km/h (50 mph) (Maximum design speed)

Line 7 of the Tianjin Metro (Chinese: 天津地铁7号线; pinyin: Tiānjīn Dìtiě Qī Hào Xiàn) is a metro line in Tianjin, China. This is the first line of Tianjin Metro system operating under PPP contract.

Line 7 has a total length of 42.53 kilometers, from Beichen District High-speed Railway North Xincheng Station to Xiqing District Saida Bazhi Road Station. The first phase of the project has a total length of 26.53km, 21 stations, and an estimated investment of 26.897 billion RMB, of which 19.681 billion RMB is included in the scope of PPP projects, of which the project cost is about 14.651 billion RMB.

On 28 September 2025 at 6:17 am, the southern section of Line 7 from Saidalu to Gulou with 15 stations was officially put into operation.

== Opening Timeline ==
| Segment | Commencement | Length | Station(s) | Name |
|---|---|---|---|---|
| Saidalu — Gulou | 30 June 2025 | 21.82 km (13.56 mi) | 15 | South section |

== List of stations ==
| Station name | | Transfer | Distance km | Location |
| Pinyin | Chinese | Transfer | Distance km | Location |
|---|---|---|---|---|
| Saidalu | 赛达路 | | | Xiqing |
| Lubeilu | 芦北路 | | | Xiqing |
| Hongyuandao | 宏源道 | | | Xiqing |
| Xinghuadao | 兴华道 | | | Xiqing |
| Zhangdaokou | 张道口 | | | Xiqing |
| Meijianghuizhanzhongxinnan | 梅江会展中心南 | | | Xiqing |
| Wanglanzhuang | 王兰庄 | | | Xiqing |
| Lijiangdao | 丽江道 | Tianjin Metro Line 10 | | Xiqing |
| Zhongliuyiyuan | 肿瘤医院 | Tianjin Metro Line 5 Tianjin Metro Line 6 | | Hexi |
| Tianta | 天塔 | Tianjin Metro Line 3 | | Nankai |
| Nankaidaxuebalitai | 南开大学八里台 | Tianjin Metro Line 11 | | Nankai |
| Tianjindaxueliulitai | 天津大学六里台 | Tianjin Metro Line 8 | | Heping |
| Haiguangsi | 海光寺 | Tianjin Metro Line 1 | | Nankai |
| Fuandajie | 福安大街 | | | Heping |
| Gulou | 鼓楼 | Tianjin Metro Line 2 | | Nankai |
