= Ten. =

Ten. may refer to:

- a common abbreviation in musical notation for tenuto
- the standard botanical author abbreviation of Michele Tenore

== See also ==
- Ten (disambiguation)
