= Huashanli station =

Metro station in Hexi District, Tianjin, China

Huashanli 华山里
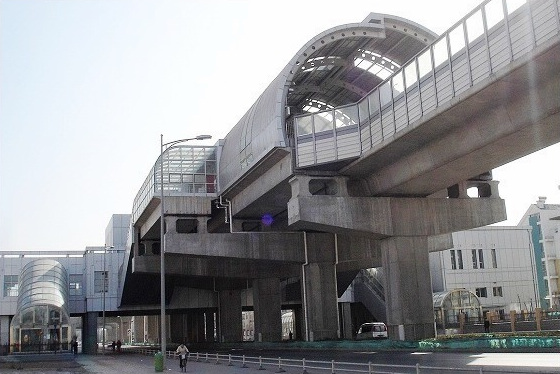

General information
- Location: Hexi District, Tianjin; China
- Coordinates: 39°03′54″N 117°15′21″E
- Operator: Tianjin Metro
- Line: Line 1
- Platforms: 2

History
- Opened: 12 June 2006

Services
Preceding station	Tianjin Metro	Following station
Caijingdaxue towards Shuangqiaohe	Line 1	Fuxingmen towards Liuyuan
Location

Huashanli station (Chinese: 华山里站; pinyin: Huáshānlǐ zhàn) is an elevated metro station located in Hexi District, Tianjin, China. It is a station on the Line 1 of the Tianjin Metro.

== Station configuration ==
Huashanli station is an elevated station located on the median strip in the middle of Weishan Road. The station consists of the platform level (level 2) and concourse level (level 1).

=== Concourse level ===
The concourse is located on the level 1. The passengers must check-in through ticket barriers before being allowed to enter the platforms. The station information centre can provide essential services, including ticket sales (including refills) and Lost and Found services. In addition, the station hall also has ticket vending machine, Shenzhen Development Bank automatic teller machines and other self-service facilities.

=== Platforms ===
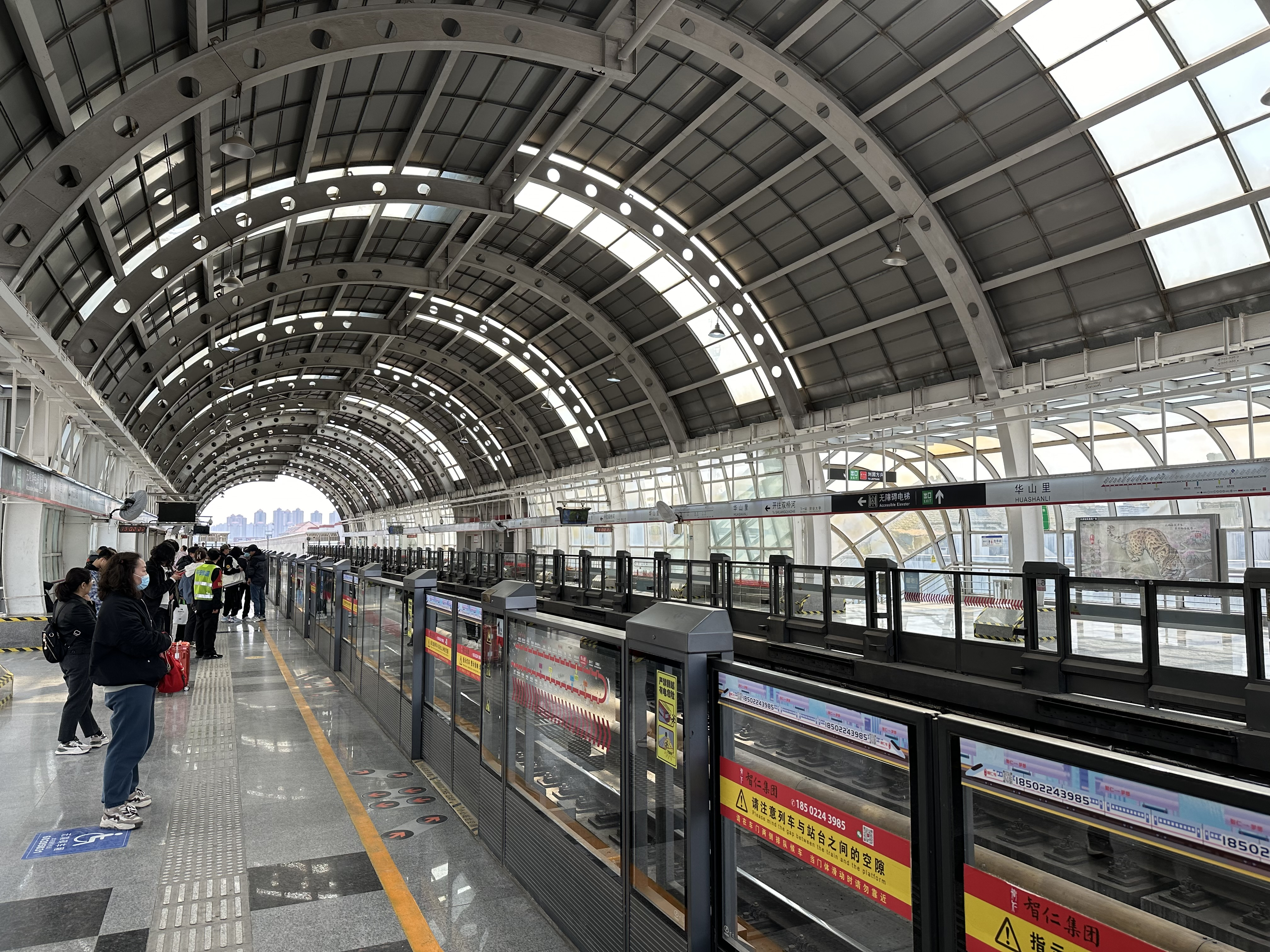
Platform

The platforms are arranged in side platform configuration, each 3.5 metres wide. The platforms have platform screen doors (PSDs).

=== Station exits ===
Huashanli Station has four exits, all of which are located on either side of Weishan Road. B and C are located on the west side and A and D on the east. The exits are linked to the main structure station via two connecting bridges which span across the road. There are 2 elevators available. The respective exits and the nearby facilities and attractions are listed below:

- Exit A - Guifaxiang Store (桂发祥), Lishan Li (骊山里), Tianshan Li (天山里), Kunlun Li (昆仑里)、Xiaohaidi Public Security Bureau (小海地派出所)
- Exit B - Sijixinyuan (四季馨园), Longdou Shidai Xincheng (龙都时代新城), Tianjin International United Tire & Rubber Co., Ltd. (天津国际联合轮胎橡胶有限公司)
- Exit C - Tianjin No. 4 Hospital (天津第四医院), Duantai Apartments (瑞泰公寓), Bus Interchange Station (公共汽车换乘站)
- Exit D - Hexi District Communist Party School (河西区委党校), Taoshan Li (泰山里), Huashan Li (华山里), Kunlun (昆仑里)

== Transport links ==
=== Buses ===
- No. 93, 97, 631, 657, 662, 665, 676, 693, 800, etc.
