= 10x10 =

10x10 or 10×10 may refer to:

- 10×10, a common multiplication table size
- 10x10 (film), a 2018 American thriller film
- 10x10 (album), an album by Ronnie Montrose
- 10x10, a 1989-2000 anthology TV series on BBC Two, consisting of short films by new film school graduates
- "10x10", a filmmaker challenge at Sacramento Film and Music Festival
- 10×10 draughts, a synonym of international draughts
- "10x10", a song by the American group the Temptations from the 1987 album Together Again
- "10x10", a song by the English electronic music group 808 State from the 1993 album Gorgeous
- "10x10", a song by the American band Yeah Yeah Yeahs from the 2007 EP Is Is

== See also ==
- 1010 (disambiguation)
- Ten10 (disambiguation)
