= Line 10 =

Line 10 may refer to:

== Asia ==
- Line 10 (Beijing Subway), a rapid transit line in Beijing
- Line 10 (Chengdu Metro), a rapid transit line in Chengdu, Sichuan
- Line 10 (Chongqing Rail Transit), a rapid transit line in Chongqing
- Line 10 (Guangzhou Metro), a rapid transit line in Guangzhou, Guangdong
- Line 10 (Hangzhou Metro), a rapid transit line in Hangzhou, Zhejiang
- Line 10 (Nanjing Metro), a rapid transit line in Nanjing, Jiangsu
- Line 10 (Ningbo Rail Transit), a rapid transit line in Ningbo and Cixi, Zhejiang
- Line 10 (Shanghai Metro), a rapid transit line in Shanghai
- Line 10 (Shenyang Metro), a rapid transit line in Shenyang, Liaoning
- Line 10 (Shenzhen Metro), a rapid transit line in Shenzhen, Guangdong
- Line 10 (Tianjin Metro), a rapid transit line in Tianjin
- Line 10 (Mumbai Metro), an rapid transit line in Mumbai, India
- MRT Line 10, a proposed rapid transit line in the Philippines
- Golden Line (Delhi Metro), a rapid transit line in Delhi, India
- KL Sentral–Terminal Skypark Line, formerly Skypark Link, or line 10, a limited express train service in Kuala Lumpur, Malaysia

== Europe ==
- Line 10 (BLT), a tramway in Basel, Switzerland
- Line 10 (Madrid Metro), a rapid transit line in Spain
- Line 10 (Moscow Metro), the Lyublinsko-Dmitrovskaya line in Russia
- Line 10 (Naples Metro), a rapid transit line in Naples, Italy
- Line 10, part of the Blue Line (Stockholm Metro), in Sweden
- Line 10 (Metrovalencia), an under construction tram and metro line in Valencia, Spain
- Barcelona Metro line 10, a rapid transit line in Spain
- CFL Line 10, a railway line in Luxembourg
- Paris Metro Line 10, a rapid transit line in France
- Rodalies Barcelona line 10, a former commuter railway in Spain

== America ==
- 10 (Los Angeles Railway), a former streetcar line in Los Angeles, California
- Line 10 (CPTM), a regional rail line in São Paulo, Brazil
- Hurontario LRT an under construction LRT line in Mississauga, Ontario, numbered Line 10

== See also ==
- List of public transport routes numbered 10
