= Number 10 =

Number 10, #10 or variations thereof may refer to:

- 10 (number), the natural number itself
- 10 Downing Street, the UK Prime Minister's office
- No. 10, a standard envelope size in North America

== Fiction, art and entertainment ==
- #10 (The Guess Who album)
- Number 10 (J. J. Cale album)
- Number Ten (Manning album)
- Number 10 (TV series), a 1983 drama about seven British Prime Ministers
- Number 10 (drama series), a radio program about a fictional British Prime Minister
- Number Ten (novel), by Sue Townsend
- No. 10 (Rothko), a 1958 painting
- Number 10, a film about rugby union by Darrell Roodt
- Number Ten, a variation of the solitaire card game Forty Thieves
- #10, the designation of Sportacus, a major character in the children's television show LazyTown

== Other uses ==
- Number 10, the shirt number often worn by an association football team's playmaker
- Guy Lafleur (1953-2022), Canadiens hockey player with sweater number 10, frequently known by his number
- Japanese minesweeper No. 10, any of several ships

== See also ==
- Ten (disambiguation)
- Nummer 10, Danish association football club F.C. Copenhagen's training ground
