= Line 2 (Tianjin Metro) =

Metro line in Tianjin, China

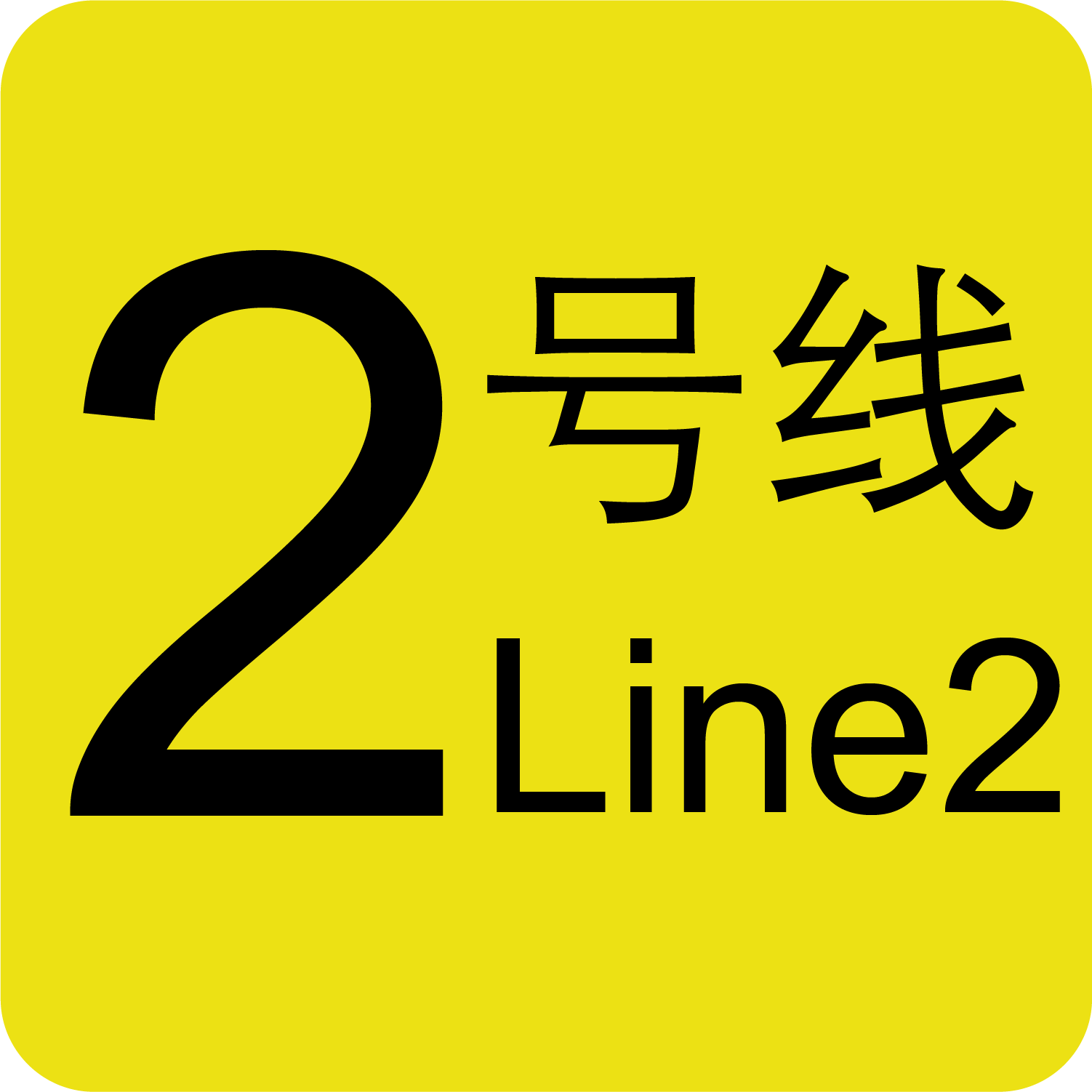

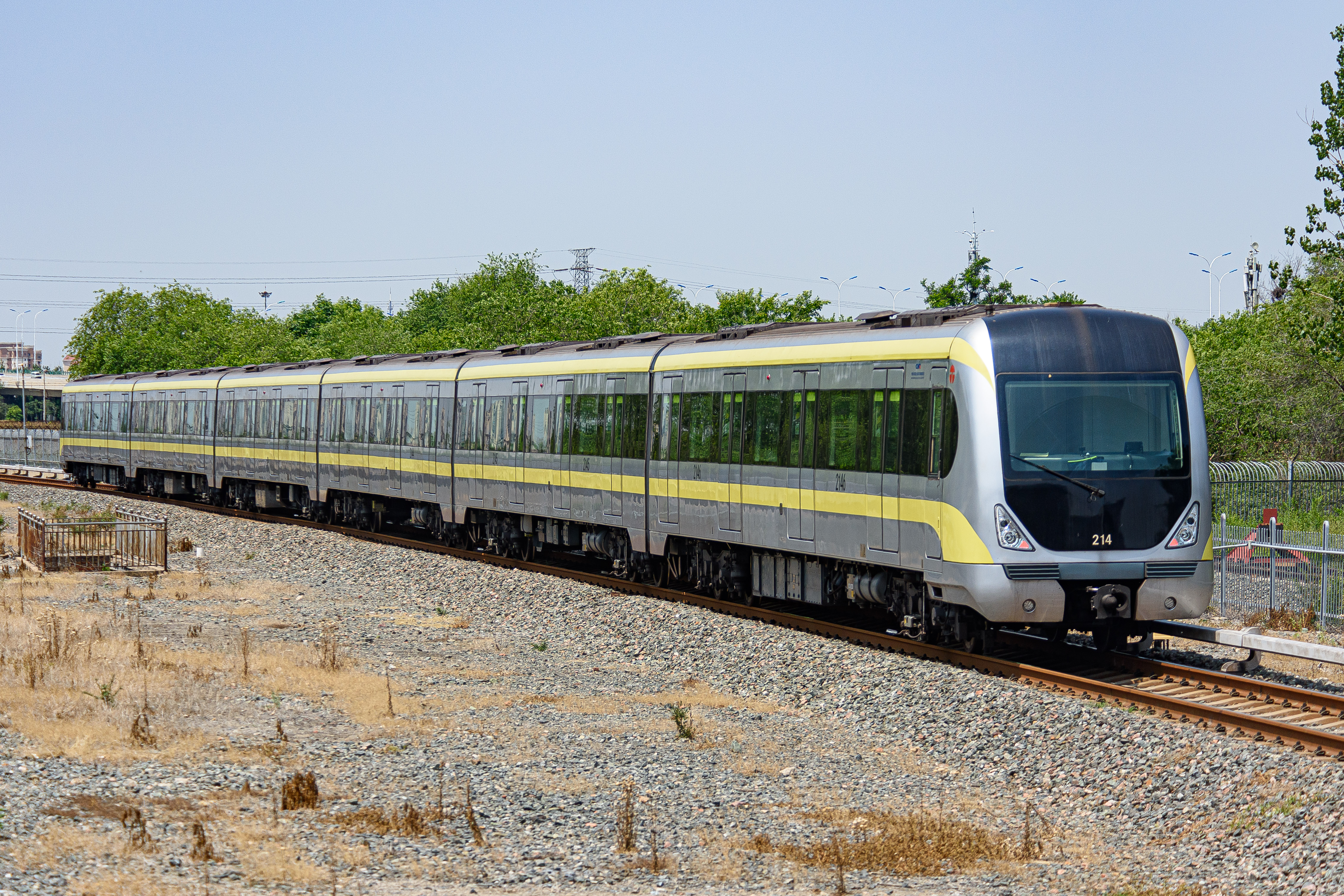
- Line 2 train leaving Konggangjingjiqu station

Overview
- Status: Operational
- Owner: Tianjin City Infrastructure Construction and Investment Group Ltd.
- Locale: Tianjin, China
- Termini: Caozhuang; Binhaiguojijichang
- Stations: 20

Service
- Type: Rapid transit
- System: Tianjin Metro
- Services: 1
- Operator(s): CHSR Line 2 (Tianjin) Rail Transit Operation Co., Ltd.

History
- Opened: 1 July 2012; 14 years ago

Technical
- Line length: 27.157 km (16.87 mi)
- Number of tracks: 2
- Character: Underground
- Track gauge: 1,435 mm (4 ft 8 1/2 in)

Line 2 of the Tianjin Metro (Chinese: 天津地铁二号线; pinyin: Tiānjīn Dìtiě Èr Hào Xiàn) is a rapid transit line running from west to east Tianjin. Opened on 1 July 2012, the line is 27.157 km long and has 20 stations. It is mostly underground; all stations, with the exception of surface-level station Caozhuang, are underground.

In May 2011, during construction, a section of tunnel west of Tianjin railway station was flooded with water from the Hai River and collapsed, trapping one of the TBMs. It was deemed too expensive to remove the trapped TBM, so a decision to abandon the TBM and dig a new tunnel around it was made. This delayed the original opening date from late 2011 to 2012. After the line opened for trial operations on 1 July 2012, it operated in two separate sections until the affected section finished reconstruction and Jianguodao Station opened on 28 August 2013, finally reconnecting the two sections.

== Opening timeline ==
Segment	Commencement	Length	Station(s)	Name
Caozhuang — Dongnanjiao	1 July 2012	9.1 km (5.65 mi)	8	(initial phase)
Tianjinzhan — Konggangjingjiqu	1 July 2012	11.6 km (7.21 mi)	9	(initial phase)
Jieyuanxidao	18 November 2012	Infill station	1	
Dongnanjiao — Tianjinzhan	28 August 2013	1.95 km (1.21 mi)	1	Hai River tunnel reconstruction project
Konggangjingjiqu — Binhaiguojijichang	28 August 2014	4.5 km (2.80 mi)	1	Airport extension

== Stations (west to east) ==
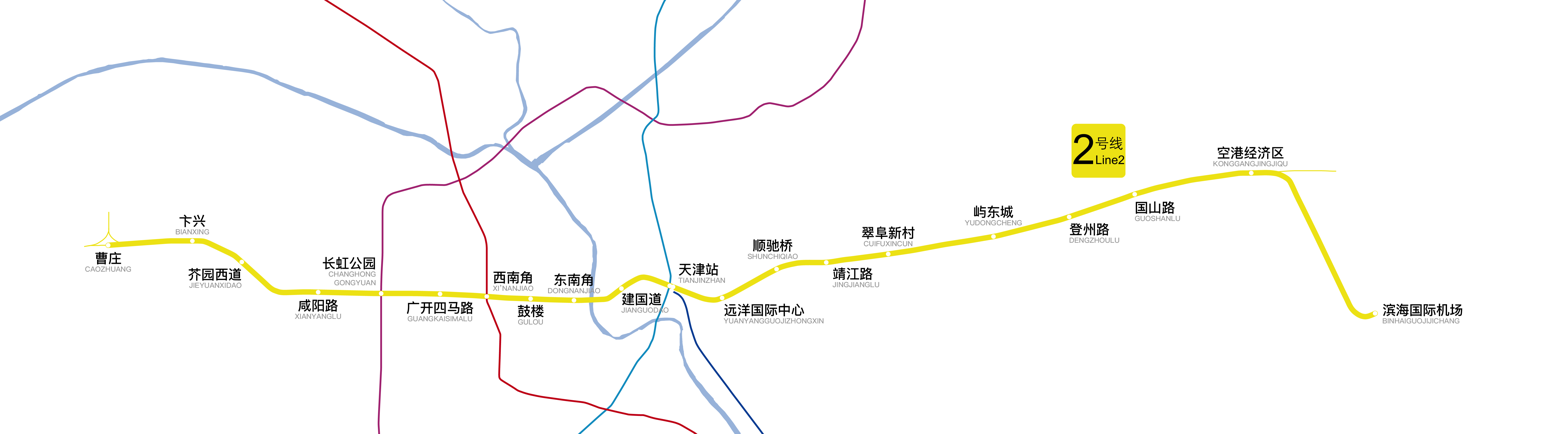
Line 2 drawn to scale.

Station name		Connections	Bus Connections	Distance km		Location
English	Chinese	Connections	Bus Connections	Distance km		Location
Caozhuang	曹庄		366 385 603 616 620 714 909 地铁试验巴士1线-中北线 通勤616	0.00	0.00	Xiqing
Bianxing	卞兴			1.60	1.60	Xiqing
Jieyuanxidao	芥园西道		31 645 645区间 672 686 841 851 858 863 867	1.02	2.62	Xiqing
Xianyanglu	咸阳路		31 308 836 858 867	1.56	4.18	Nankai
Changhonggongyuan	长虹公园	Tianjin Metro Line 6	47 47区间 48 48区间 52 191 192 645 645区间 673 686 841 858 867 879 903 911 通勤3 通学3	1.18	5.36	Nankai
Guangkaisimalu	广开四马路		191 645 645区间 673 841 903 通学3	1.10	6.46	Nankai
Xi'nanjiao	西南角	Tianjin Metro Line 1	191 628 645 645区间 669 673 676 837 849 860 863 903 通勤3	0.85	7.31	Nankai
Gulou	鼓楼	Tianjin Metro Line 7	191 633 641 645 645区间 837 840 849 860	0.80	8.11	Heping / Nankai
Dongnanjiao	东南角	Tianjin Metro Line 4	1 1区间 5 24 37 156 158 619 634 671 688 693 801 804 836 837 观光3	0.79	8.90	Nankai
Jianguodaoyifengqu	建国道意风区		5 156 461 635 806 836 观光3	0.99	9.89	Hebei
Tianjinzhan	天津站	TJP	5 8 8区间 13 24 27 28 35 35区间 50 96 96区间 97 150大圈 156 158 176 181 182 185 186 186快线 187 188 188盘山旅游专线 195 196 198 199 461 462航母旅游专线 462专线 468 528 570快线 570专线 574 607 621 634 635 638 639东线 639西线 645 645区间 651 660 663 666 672 676 701 749 760 802 806 808 813 824 827 828 832 836 868 905 951 953 961 观光3 国展定制2线 环球影城直通车 机场穿梭车 机场大巴天津站 机场天津站线 京津城际商务班车 跨城穿梭车 通勤570 通勤832 小187路低速线	0.96	10.85	Hedong
Yuanyangguojizhongxin	远洋国际中心		35 35区间 96 96区间 368 461 462航母旅游专线 462专线 468 516市区线 528 570快线 574 600内环 600外环 635 639东线 640 663 666 681 803 827 828 836 856 868 905 916	1.02	11.87	Hedong
Shunchiqiao	顺驰桥		42 327 340 635 663	1.11	12.98	Hedong
Jingjianglu	靖江路	Tianjin Metro Line 5	32 35 35区间 327 353 602 622 635 660 663 861 907 机场专线4	0.96	13.94	Hedong
Cuifuxincun	翠阜新村		32 35 35区间 353 461 462航母旅游专线 462专线 468 574 602 622 635 660 663 861 907 机场专线4	1.14	15.08	Hedong
Yudongcheng	屿东城	Tianjin Metro Line 10	32 369 461 462航母旅游专线 462专线 468 574 622 640 660 663 668 677 685 697 715 715北线 817 827 866 907 快速1 通勤685 通勤715 通勤快速1	1.96	17.04	Hedong
Dengzhoulu	登州路		339 516西区线 528 574 622 660 663 677 818	1.44	18.48	Dongli
Guoshanlu	国山路		339	1.25	19.73	Dongli
Konggangjingjiqu	空港经济区		114 575 654 654区间 689 691 692高峰线 692区间 695 696 696专线	1.21	20.94	Dongli
Binhaiguojijichang	滨海国际机场	TSN	滨海国际机场武清线 国展定制1线 机场巴士蓟州线 机场巴士王顶堤线 机场穿梭车 机场大巴天津站 机场天津西站线 机场天津站线 机场专线4 机场专线7 天津机场大巴沧州线 天津机场大巴中捷线	3.94	24.88	Dongli

== Rolling Stock ==
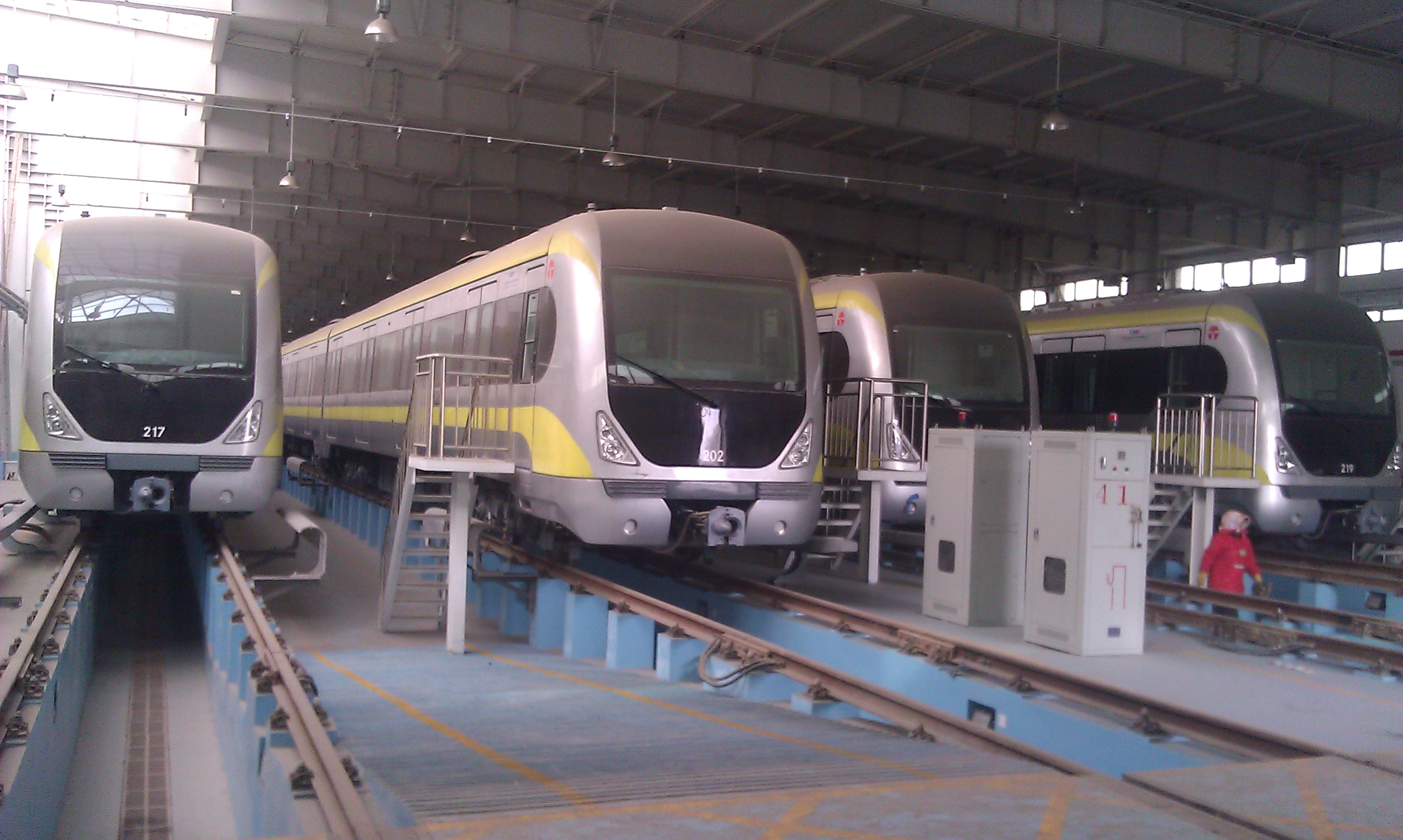
A Line 2 trains in depot

Type	Time of manufacturing	Series	Sets	Assembly	Notes
Type B	2009 - 2011	Unknown	23	Tc+M+T+M+M+Tc	Manufactured by CRRC Dalian
Type B	2014 - 2015	Unknown	4	Tc+M+T+M+M+Tc	Manufactured by CRRC Dalian
