= 1010 (disambiguation) =

1010 is the year AD 1010.

1010 may also refer to:

== Media and music ==
- 10:10 (film), a 2008 Indian film
- "1010 (Rin Tin Tin)", a song by Prince from Welcome 2 America
- "10/10" (Paolo Nutini song), 2010
- "10/10" (Maître Gims song), 2020
- "10/10" (Rex Orange County song), 2019
- "10/10", a song by Troye Sivan from In a Dream, 2020
- 10/10, a 2020 album by Ledri Vula
- 1010, a 2020 album by Benny Jamz

== Other uses ==
- 1000 AM, an AM radio frequency
- October 10
- 10:10, a climate change campaign
- 1O1O, a brand of Hong Kong mobile network operator CSL Mobile

== See also ==
- Ten10 (disambiguation)
- 10x10 (disambiguation)
