= TEN Group =

TEN Group may refer to

- Ten Group, a British lifestyle concierge company
- The Transforming Education in Norfolk Group, a former federation of college and academy bodies formed around City College Norwich

== See also ==
- Ten Network Holdings
