= Line 10 (Tianjin Metro) =

Metro line in Tianjin, China

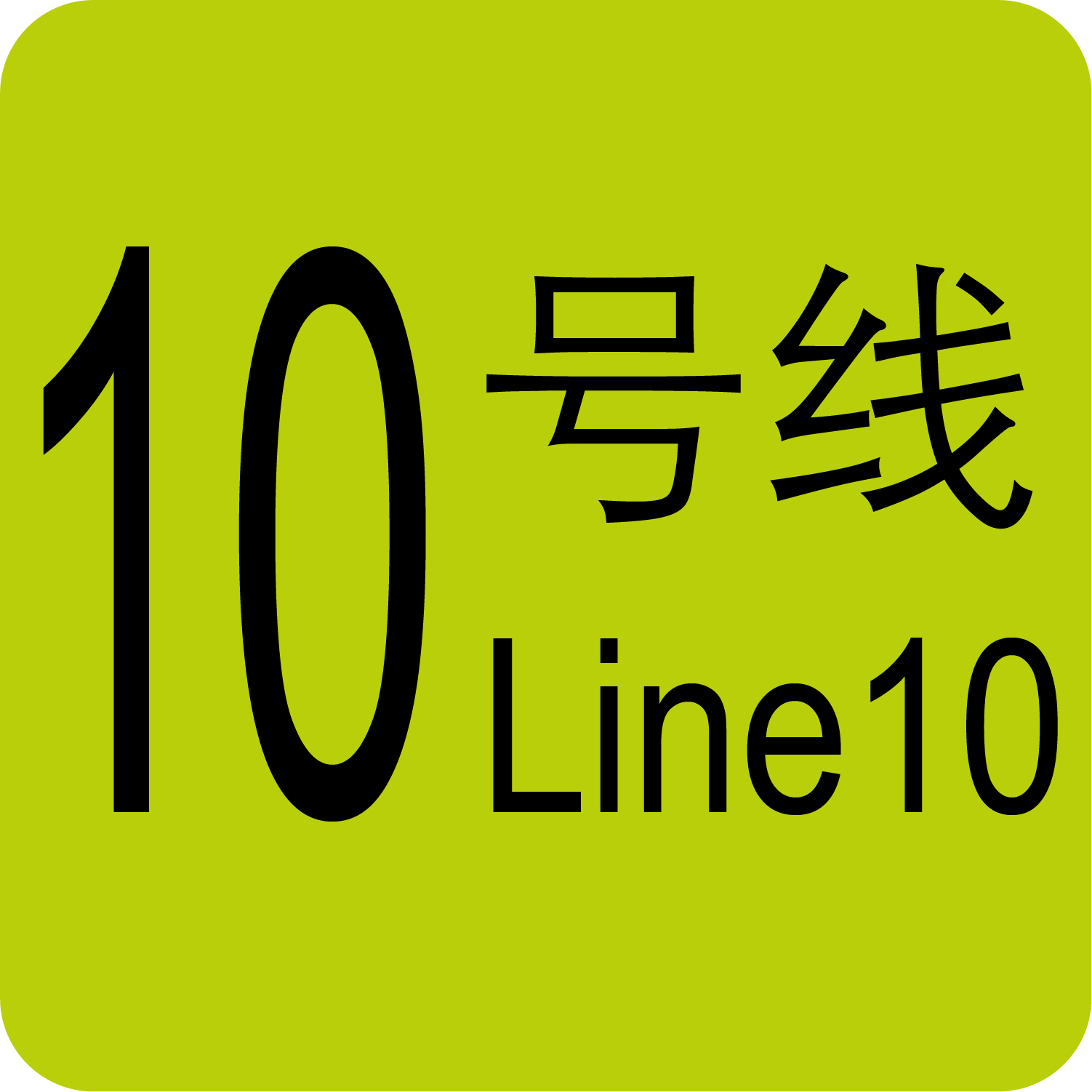

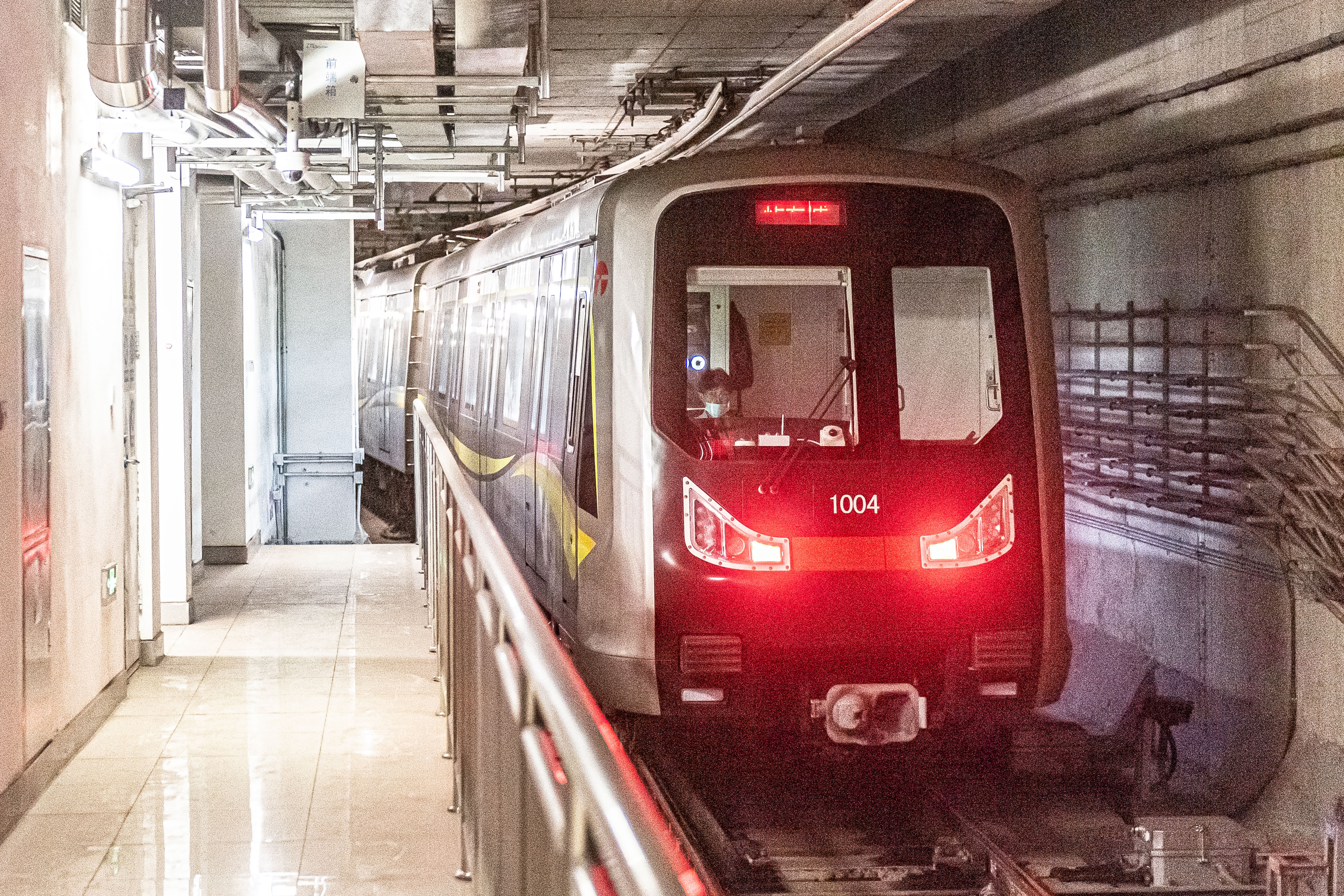
- Line 10 train leaving Yudongcheng station

Overview
- Status: Operational
- Locale: Tianjin, China
- Termini: Yutai; Yudongcheng
- Stations: 21 (Phase 1)

Service
- Type: Rapid transit
- System: Tianjin Metro

History
- Opened: 18 November 2022

Technical
- Line length: 21.2 km (13.2 mi) (Phase 1)
- Track gauge: 1,435 mm (4 ft 8 1/2 in)

Line 10 of Tianjin Metro (Chinese: 天津地铁10号线) is a metro line in Tianjin, China.

== History ==
On 14 September 2015, Line 10 from Liyuantou to Nandian was approved by National Development and Reform Commission as part of Phase II Construction Plan of Tianjin Rail Transit.

Construction of Yudongcheng station on Line 10 started on 28 July 2016.

The section from Yutai to Yudongcheng opened on 18 November 2022.

== Stations (southwest to northeast) ==
Station name		Connections	Distance km	Location
English	Chinese	Connections	Distance km	Location
Yutai	于台			Xiqing
Yaohuanlu	瑶环路			Xiqing
Changlinglu	昌凌路	Tianjin Metro Line 5		Xiqing
Lijiangdao	丽江道	Tianjin Metro Line 7		Xiqing
Jiangwanerzhilu	江湾二支路			Xiqing
Youyinanlu	友谊南路	(via Zuojiangdao)		Hexi
Nanzhuqiao	南珠桥	Tianjin Metro Line 8		Hexi
Chunhailu	春海路			Hexi
Magangchang	玛钢厂			Hexi
Weishanlu	微山路			Hexi
Caijingdaxue	财经大学	Tianjin Metro Line 1		Hexi
Liulinlu	柳林路			Hexi
Huanyudao	环宇道	Tianjin Metro Line 11		Dongli
Longhandao	龙涵道	(via Yihaoqiao)		Hedong
Jinmaochanyeyuan	金贸产业园			Hedong
Fangshandao	方山道			Dongli
Shaliunanlu	沙柳南路	Tianjin Metro Line 4		Dongli
Wanshandao	万山道			Dongli
Xiangshandao	香山道			Dongli / Hedong
Laoshandao	崂山道			Hedong
Yudongcheng	屿东城	Tianjin Metro Line 2		Hedong
Lushandao	鲁山道			Hedong
Nandian	南淀			Hedong

== Future Development ==
Phase 1 North Section

The North Section of Phase 1 of Line 10, from Yudongcheng to Nandian is under planning. It will be fully underground and 3.325 km in length, with 2 new stations.

Southern extension

A Southern extension from Yutai to Liyuantou Depot is also under planning. The extension will be 1.32 km in length with 1 new station.
