= List of public transport routes numbered 10 =

In public transport, Route 10 may refer to:

- Route 10 (MTA Maryland), a bus route in Baltimore, Maryland and its suburbs
- London Buses route 10
- Line 10 (Madrid Metro)
- SEPTA Route 10, a streetcar in Philadelphia, Pennsylvania
- Shanghai Metro Line 10, a subway line in Shanghai

== See also ==
- Line 10 (disambiguation)
