= Ten Brothers (disambiguation) =

Ten Brothers is a Chinese legend.

Ten Brothers may also refer to:

- Ten Brothers (1985 TV series), a Hong Kong series on ATV adapting the legend
- Ten Brothers (2007 TV series), a Hong Kong series on TVB adapting the legend
- Ten Brothers (1995 film), a Hong Kong film adaptation starring Sharla Cheung
