= Binhaiguojijichang station =

Metro station in Tianjin, China

Coordinates: 39.13192°N 117.35523°E

Binhaiguojijichang 滨海国际机场
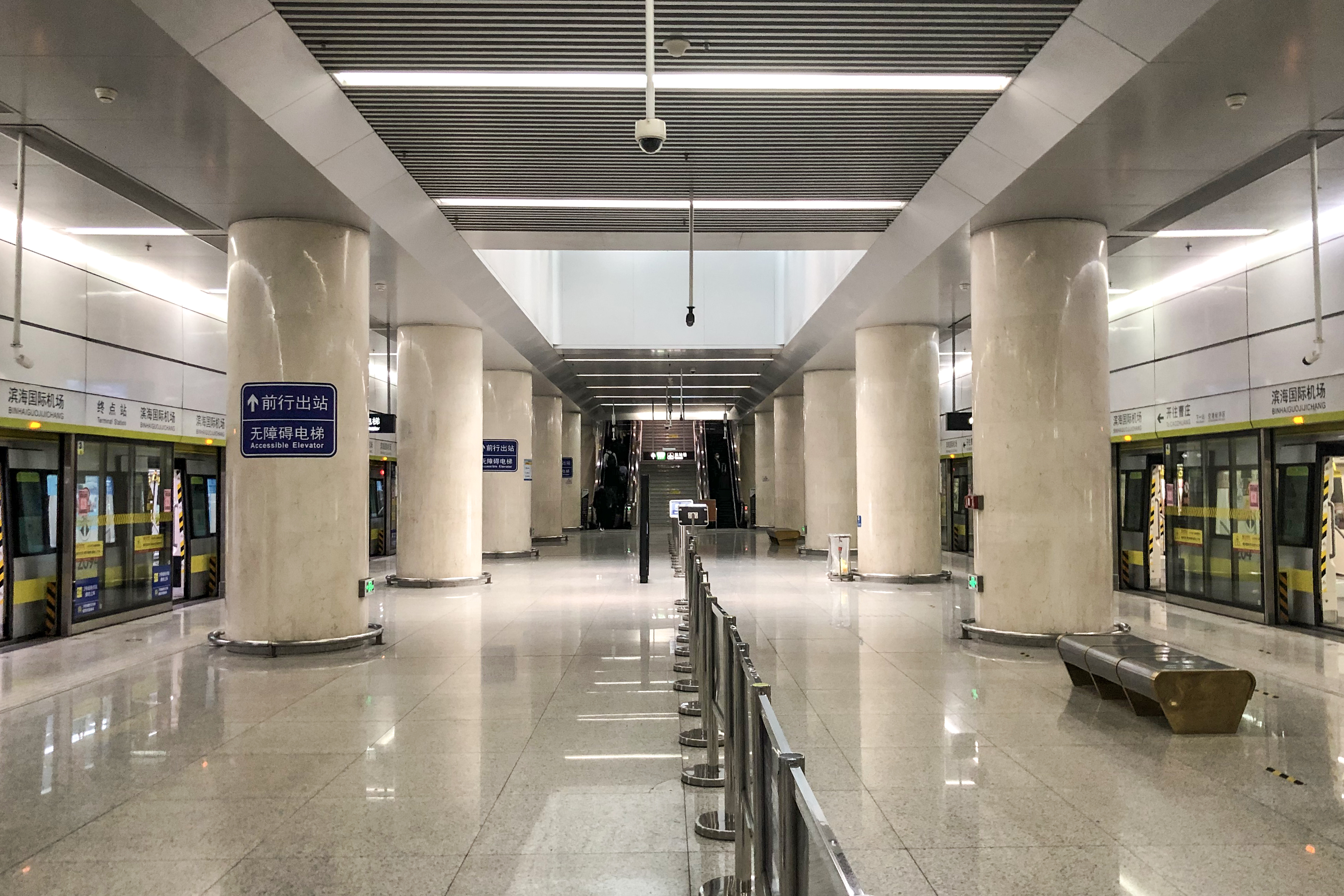

General information
- Other names: Binhai International Airport
- Location: Dongli District, Tianjin; China
- Operated by: Tianjin Metro Co. Ltd.
- Line: Line 2
- Connections: Tianjin Binhai International Airport

Construction
- Structure type: Underground

History
- Opened: 28 August 2014

Services
Preceding station	Tianjin Metro	Following station
Konggangjingjiqu towards Caozhuang	Line 2	Terminus
Location

Binhaiguojijichang station (Chinese: 滨海国际机场站; pinyin: Bīnhǎi Guójì Jīchǎng zhàn; lit. 'Binhai International Airport station') is the eastern terminus station of Line 2 of the Tianjin Metro. The station serves the Tianjin Binhai International Airport. It started operations on 28 August 2014, along with the new Terminal 2 of the airport.
