= Caozhuang station =

Metro station in Tianjin, China

Caozhuang 曹庄
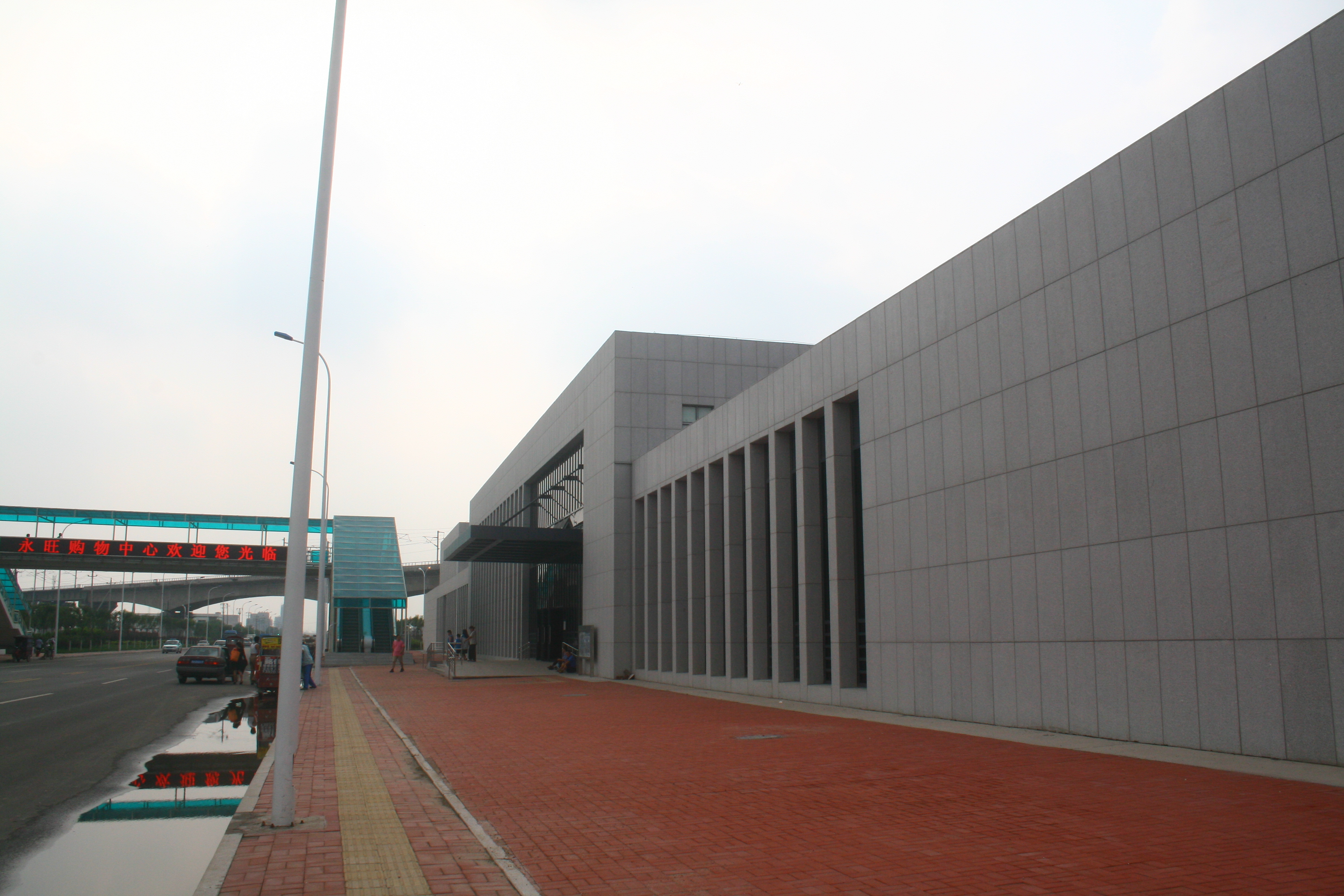

General information
- Location: Xiqing District, Tianjin; China
- Coordinates: 39.1444°N 117.0844°E
- Operator: Tianjin Metro Co. Ltd.
- Line: Line 2

Construction
- Structure type: Underground

History
- Opened: 1 July 2012

Services
Preceding station	Tianjin Metro	Following station
Terminus	Line 2	Bianxing towards Binhaiguojijichang
Location

Caozhuang Station (Chinese: 曹庄站) is a station of Line 2 western section of the Tianjin Metro. It started operations on 1 July 2012.
