= OL =

OL may refer to:

== Arts and entertainment ==
- Orphaned Land, an Israeli progressive metal band
- Old Lace (comics) a telepathically linked dinosaur hero

== Businesses and organizations ==
- OLT Express Germany (IATA airline code OL), a scheduled and charter airline based in Emden in Germany
- Open Library, an online project intended to create "one web page for every book ever published"
- OL Groupe (Olympique Lyonnais), a French sporting business holding company

== Places ==
- OL postcode area, for parts of Greater Manchester and Lancashire, surrounding Oldham, England
- Oulu railway station, Finland (abbreviated OL)

== Science and technology ==
- -ol, a suffix for chemical compounds that are alcohols
- Guillaume-Antoine Olivier, in botanist or zoologist author citations (Ol.)
- <ol></ol>, an HTML tag for creating ordered list elements
- Optics Letters, a journal published by the Optical Society of America
- A Unified Soil Classification System symbol for organic silt and/or clay

== Sport ==
- Olympic Games, an international sport event
- Olympique Lyonnais, a prominent French association football club based in Lyon
  - OL Lyonnes, the women's football section of the above club
  - OL Reign, the name of the American women's soccer team now known as Seattle Reign FC when it was primarily owned by the parent company of Olympique Lyonnais
- Offensive lineman, a player who plays on the offensive line of scrimmage in American football
- Olympique Lillois, formerly a French association football club

== Other ==
- Office lady, a low-tier female office worker in Japan
- Old Lancastrians, alumni of Lancaster Royal Grammar School, England
- Old Lawrentians, alumni of St Lawrence College, Ramsgate, England
- Old Lorettonians, alumni of Loretto School, Scotland
- Ol Chiki script, writing script for Santali language
- Ol Onal script, writing script for Bhumij language
- Singapore-Cambridge GCE Ordinary Level, a standardized examination in Singapore
- Orange Lodge, a local branch of the Orange Order.

== See also ==
- O1 (disambiguation)
- OI (disambiguation)
- 0I (disambiguation)
- 0L (disambiguation)
- 01 (disambiguation)
