= 1O =

1O or 1-O or 1º (the digit "1" and the letter "O") may refer to:

- 1º Sector, the primary sector of the economy
- 2017 Catalan independence referendum, called for 1 October 2017, known as 1-O

== See also ==
- 1º de Mayo (disambiguation)
- 10 (disambiguation) (the digit "1" followed by the digit "0")
- I0 (disambiguation) (the letter "I" followed by the digit "0")
- IO (disambiguation) (the letter "I" followed by the letter "O")
- O1 (disambiguation) (the letter "O" followed by the digit "1")
- First officer (disambiguation)
- Primo (disambiguation)
- Glucogallin, or 1-O-galloyl-beta-D-glucose
- Isomalt, or 1-O-alpha-D-glucopyranosyl-D-mannitol
- Corilagin, or Beta-1-O-galloyl-3,6-(R)-hexahydroxydiphenoyl-d-glucose
