= Io =

Io most commonly refers to:

- Io (moon), a moon of Jupiter
- Io (mythology), daughter of Inachus in Greek mythology, and lover of Zeus who was turned into a heifer

Io, IO, iO, I/O, i/o, or i.o. may also refer to:

== Arts, entertainment and media ==
=== Fictional elements ===
- Io, one of DC Comics' Amazons
- Scylla Io, one of Poseidon's Marine Generals in the Saint Seiya series
- A Dungeons & Dragons dragon deity
- Io Otonashi, a main character in the Japanese manga series Place to Place (Acchi Kocchi)
- Io Nitta, a character in the game Shin Megami Tensei: Devil Survivor 2

=== Gaming ===
- iO, a 2014 video game by Gamious
- IO Interactive, a Danish computer game developer

=== Music ===
- IO (German band)
- Io (English band)
- I_o (musician), an American DJ and record producer (1990–2020)
- i/o (Peter Gabriel album), 2023

=== Theatre and opera ===
- Io (opera), an unfinished acte de ballet (opera) by Jean-Philippe Rameau
- iO Theater (ImprovOlympic), a theater in Chicago, Illinois, dedicated to improvisational comedy
- IO West, a Los Angeles theater associated with the Chicago iO

=== Other uses in arts, entertainment and media ===
- EO (film) (original Polish title: IO), a 2022 Jerzy Skolimowski film
- Io (film), a 2019 Netflix film
- iO Digital Cable Service, a service offered by Cablevision
- International Organization, a peer-reviewed journal that covers the entire field of international affairs

== Business and economics concepts ==
- Industrial and organizational psychology, the field of psychology that studies work, academic, and other organizational issues
- Industrial organization, the field of economics that studies the strategic behavior of firms, the structure of markets and their interactions
- Insertion order, a business document specifying the inventory goal of an advertising campaign
- Integrated operations, a term used in the petroleum industry describing new work processes and ways of working that have been facilitated by modern information and communication technologies
- Interest-only, a type of collateralized mortgage obligation (CMO) or mortgage-backed security

== Businesses and organizations ==
- io (company), an artificial intelligence hardware company
- Bureau of International Organization Affairs, in the U.S. Department of State
- Government Printing Bureau (Macau), known in Portuguese as the Imprensa Oficial or "IO"
- Indonesian Airlines (IATA airline designator IO)

== Language ==
- i.o., in illo ordine, Latin phrase meaning "respectively" ("in that order")
- Io (princely title), a particle of a title used by Moldavian and Wallachian Princes-regnant
- Ido language (ISO 639-1 language code IO), a constructed language
- Indirect object, the object that is the recipient of an action (by a verb)
- Yo (Cyrillic), also referred to as Io

== Mythology ==
- Io (mythology), daughter of Inachus in Greek mythology, and lover of Zeus who was turned into a cow
- Io, an alternate spelling of the nereid Ino, later known as Leukothea, who in the Odyssey gave Odysseus a veil that allowed him to breathe underwater
- Io Matua Kore, in some Māori traditions the supreme god

== People ==
- Io Murota (室田 伊緒; born 1989), Japanese shogi player
- Io Sakisaka (咲坂 伊緒), Japanese manga artist
- Io Shirai (born 1990), Japanese professional wrestler
- Iou Kuroda (黒田 硫黄; born 1971), Japanese manga artist
- iO Tillett Wright (born 1985), American artist, director, photographer, writer, film maker, activist, and actor
- Jean-Paul Appel, also known as Io, leader of the UFO religion Siderella

== Places on Earth ==
- British Indian Ocean Territory, ISO 3166-1 alpha-2 code
- Io (island), an uninhabited islet near Crete, Greece
- Io, Norway, a village in Alver, Norway
- Mount Iō (disambiguation), name of several mountains in Japan
- Indian Ocean

== Science and technology ==
=== Astronomy ===
- 85 Io, an asteroid

=== Biology and medicine ===
- Io (gastropod), a genus of freshwater snail in the family Pleuroceridae
- Io (plant), a genus of plant in the tribe Senecioneae
- Automeris io, a moth species in North America
- Aglais io, the European peacock butterfly
- Intraosseous infusion, the medical process of introducing medication directly into the bone marrow
- Hawaiian hawk (Hawaiian: ʻio)
- Immuno-oncology, another term for cancer immunotherapy

=== Computing ===
- .io, the Internet country code top-level domain (ccTLD) for the British Indian Ocean Territory (popularized by video games with the .io code)
- Io (programming language), a pure object-oriented programming language
- IO.SYS, a system file in Microsoft DOS and Windows 95, 98 and ME
- Indistinguishability obfuscation, a cryptographic tool to obscure computer code
- Input/output, the collection of interfaces that different functional units of an information processing system use to communicate with each other

=== Other uses in science and technology ===
- Ionium (symbol Io), a claimed chemical element that was later realized to be thorium-230
- Iodine monoxide (symbol IO)
- Image orthicon tube, a TV camera used between 1946 and 1968
- Infinitely often, a mathematics term sometimes written "i.o."; see an example in set-theoretic limit

== Other uses ==
- Investigating Officer, a member of law enforcement in the United Kingdom who heads an investigation
- Mitsubishi Pajero iO, a mini SUV model produced by Mitsubishi Motors
- IO (Oral-B), a series of electric toothbrushes by Oral-B

== See also ==
- Ю or yu, a Cyrillic letter
- I/O (disambiguation)
- IOS (disambiguation)
- I0 (disambiguation) (the letter "I" followed by the digit "0")
- 10 (disambiguation) (the digit "1" followed by the digit "0")
- 1O (disambiguation) (the digit "1" followed by the letter "O")
