= Primero de Mayo =

Primero de Mayo is Spanish for the First of May. It may refer to:

- Primero de Mayo Bay (now known as Fumarole Bay), Deception Island, South Shetland Islands, Antarctica
- Primero de Mayo Department, Chaco Province, Argentina
- Primero de Mayo, Entre Ríos, village and municipality in Argentina
- Primero de Mayo (Los Mangos), settlement in Pueblo Viejo Municipality, Veracruz, Mexico
- Avenida Primero de Mayo, a major road in Bogotá, Colombia
- ARA Primero de Mayo, first Argentine exploration ship in the Melchior Islands, Antarctica
- Club Primero de Mayo, Bolivian football club from Trinidad, Beni, promoted in the 2008 Copa Simón Bolívar
- Club Social, Cultural y Deportivo Primero de Mayo, football club in Guaranda, Bolívar Province, Ecuador
- Grupo Primero de Mayo, anti-Franco resistance movement in Spain

== See also ==
- May 1st (disambiguation)
