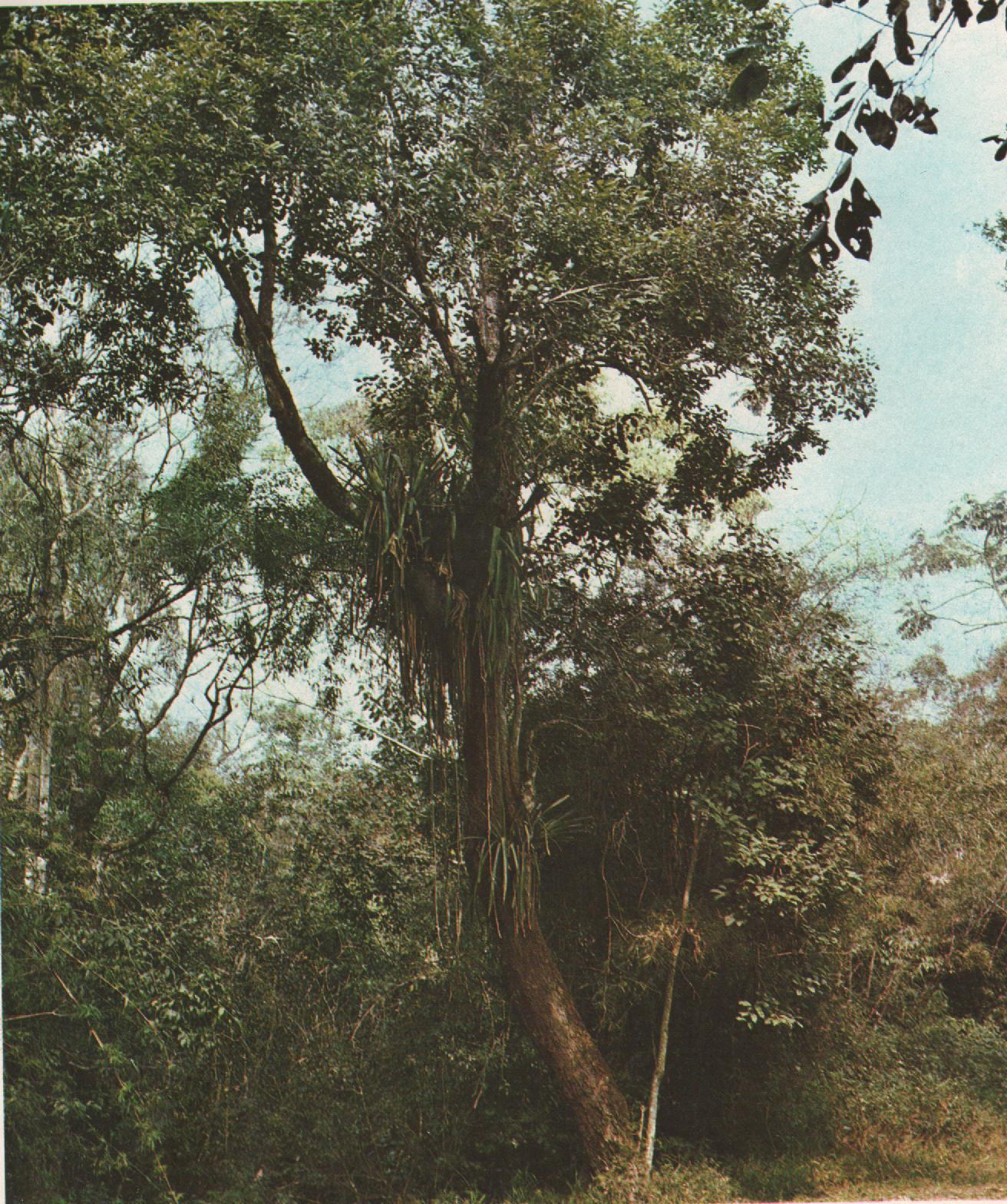

Scientific classification
- Kingdom: Plantae
- Clade: Tracheophytes
- Clade: Angiosperms
- Clade: Eudicots
- Clade: Rosids
- Order: Malpighiales
- Family: Euphorbiaceae
- Genus: Alchornea
- Species: A. glandulosa

Binomial name
- Alchornea glandulosa Poepp. & Endl.

Synonyms
- Alchornea irucurama Casar. Alchornea pittieri Pax; Alchornea subrotunda Baill. Alchornea umboensis Croizat

= Alchornea glandulosa =

Species of tree

Alchornea glandulosa is a tree species of the Acalyphoideae native to South America, growing in southern Brazil from Minas Gerais to Rio Grande do Sul. It is locally known as tamanqueiro, tapiá or amor seco. This gnarled tree grows preferentially in riparian forest, where it a common pioneer species growing to a height of 10–20 m. It is essentially evergreen, though in the hot austral summer months there is a more pronounced changeover of leaves, and branches are denuded to some extent.

== Description ==
The fruit is about 8.7 mm long by 5.9 mm wide on average, and contains one round seed measuring about 4.45 mm in diameter; very rarely a second seed develops. This sticks out of an aril at the fruit's tip; when ripe, the seedcoat turns bright red and the fruit somewhat resembles that of a yew with a larger and more prominent seed. Fruit ripen in the summer months, roughly between September/October and December/January in S Brazil, and as the trees bear less leaves at that time than otherwise, the bright red fruit are easily spotted.

== Taxonomy ==
It was first published in E.F.Poeppig & S.L.Endlicher, Nov. Gen. Sp. Pl. vol.3 on page 18 in 1841.

== Subspecies ==
It has 2 known and accepted subspecies; Alchornea glandulosa subsp. glandulosa from central & southern tropical America Alchornea glandulosa subsp. iricurana (Casar.) Secco from Bolivia, Paraguay, Brazil and north eastern Argentina.

== Uses ==
Stigmasterol can be obtained from A. glandulosa

This tree is often cut down for timber, but it is also useful as a honey plant. Also, its leaves contain compounds of medical interest. In folk medicine, Alchornea species are used to treat assorted skin diseases, diarrhea, inflammations, leprosy and rheuma.

Scientific studies have confirmed most of these effects. Species such as Davilla elliptica and Davilla nitida as well as Alchornea glandulosa, have properties that could be used in the treatment of peptic ulcers.

Studies have also found extracts of certain species to kill off trypanosoma, some bacteria and fungi, and cancer cells; the latter properties have also been tested in A. glandulosa. Compounds of interest in A. glandulosa, include the phytosterols β-sitosterol and stigmasterol, the terpenoid loliolide, the guanidine alkaloid N-1,N-2,N-3-triisopentenylguanidine, and the phenolic compound corilagin.

== Ecology ==
Given the fruit's attractive color and the conspicuous display at the branch-tips, this tree appears to be distributed by birds which eat the fruit and spread the seeds. Perching birds, namely tanagers (Thraupidae), thrushes (Turdidae) and tyrant flycatchers (Tyrannidae), are most commonly seen to feed on the fruit. Some birds, such as the silver-beaked tanager (Ramphocelus carbo), prune off the seedcoat and eat it, discarding the seed, but most swallow the entire fruit. Species such as the swallow tanager (Tersina viridis) and the pale-breasted thrush (Turdus leucomelas), but perhaps most of all the sayaca tanager (Thraupis sayaca), appear to be particularly fond of them. Indeed, the sayaca tanager will defend richly fruiting A. glandulosa trees against similar-sized birds such as the blue dacnis (Dacnis cayana) or the red-eyed vireo (Vireo olivaceus). It may be that at least locally, T. sayaca is crucial for the tree's reproduction and survival.

A. glandulosa fruit are also significant food of certain migrant birds in their winter quarters. In particular the red-eyed vireo and the white-necked thrush (Turdus albicollis) have been noted to be fond of them, and Swainson's flycatchers (Myiarchus swainsoni) visit the trees very often too. But as it does not relish the fruits very much, the latter species is perhaps more attracted to insects living on the tree.

== See also ==
- List of honey plants
- Traditional Brazilian medicine

== Other sources ==
- Conegero, Leila de Souza; Ide Massae, Regina; Nazari, Anelise Samara; Sarragiotto, Maria Helena; Dias Filho, Benedito Prado; Nakamura, Celso Vataru; de Carvalho, João Ernesto & Foglio, Mary Ann (2003): Constituintes químicos de Alchornea glandulosa (Euphorbiaceae) [Chemical constituents of Alchornea glandulosa (Euphorbiaceae)]. Quím. Nova 26(6): 825-827 [Portuguese with English abstract]. doi:10.1590/S0100-40422003000600008 PDF fulltext
- Pascotto, Márcia Cristina (2006): Avifauna dispersora de sementes de Alchornea glandulosa (Euphorbiaceae) em uma área de mata ciliar no estado de São Paulo [Seed dispersal of Alchornea glandulosa (Euphorbiaceae) by birds in a gallery forest in São Paulo, southeastern Brazil.]. Revista Brasileira de Ornitologia 14(3): 291-296 [Portuguese with English abstract]. PDF fulltext
