= L0 =

L0 may refer to:

- Haplogroup L0, a human mitochondrial DNA haplogroup
- L0 norm, a norm in mathematics
- L0 Series, a high-speed maglev train operated by the Japanese railway company JR Central

== See also ==
- 0L (disambiguation)
- Level 0 (disambiguation)
