= Officer =

Person who has a position of authority in a hierarchical organization

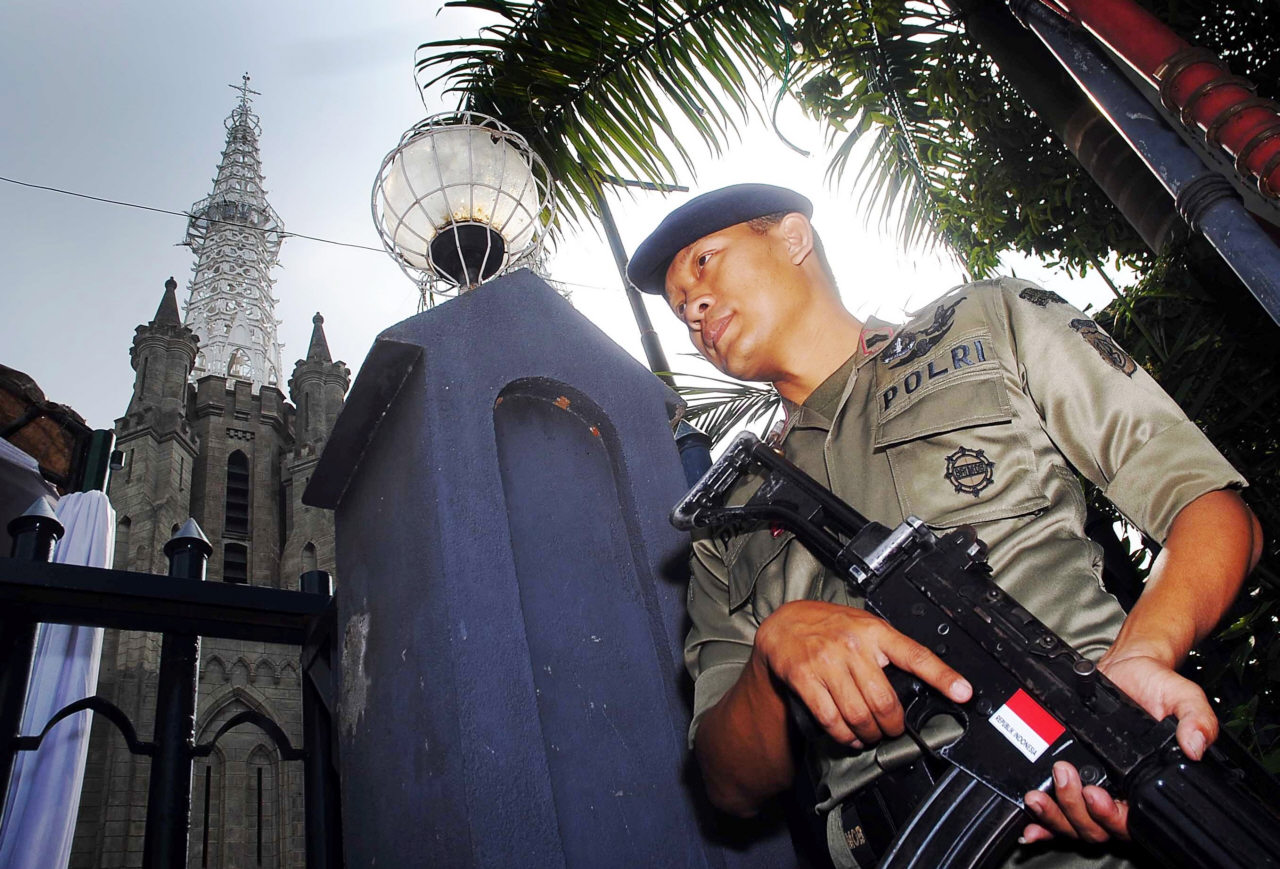
A Sabhara officer

An officer is a person who has a position of authority in a hierarchical organization. The term derives from Old French oficier "officer, official" (early 14c., Modern French officier), from Medieval Latin officiarius "an officer," from Latin officium "a service, a duty" the late Latin from officiarius, meaning "official."

== Examples ==
=== Ceremonial and other contexts ===
- Officer, and/or Grand Officer, are both a grade, class, or rank of within certain chivalric orders and orders of merit, e.g. Legion of Honour (France), Order of the Holy Sepulchre (Holy See), Order of the British Empire (UK), Order of Leopold (Belgium)
- Great Officer of State
- Merchant marine officer or licensed mariner
- Officer of arms
- Officer in The Salvation Army, and other state decorations

=== Corporations ===
- Bank officer
- Corporate officer, a corporate title
  - Chief executive officer (CEO)
  - Chief financial officer (CFO)
  - Chief operating officer (COO)
- Executive officer

=== Education ===
- Chief academic officer, a provost
- Sabbatical officer

=== Law enforcement ===
- Bylaw enforcement officer
- Corrections officer
- Customs officer
- Environmental Health Officer
- Immigration officer
- Officer of the court
- Parking enforcement officer
- Police officer
  - Police community support officer
- Security officer

=== Military ===
- Officer (armed forces)
- Commanding officer
- Petty officer

=== Politics and government ===
- Chief Medical Officer
- Foreign Service Officer, a diplomatic officer
- Internal Service Officer, a diplomatic officer
- Presiding Officer (disambiguation)
- Returning officer

=== Shipping industry ===
- Captain (nautical), the person in charge of a merchant ship
- Chief Engineering Officer, the person in charge of the technical department on a merchant ship
- Chief officer or chief mate, typically the person in charge of the deck department of a merchant ship
- Coastguard Rescue Officer, a rescue officer employed by HM Coastguard
- Second officer or second mate, typically the navigator and medical officer on a merchant ship
- Third officer or third mate, typically the safety officer on a merchant ship
- Second Engineering Officer, the person in charge of the engine room on a merchant ship
- Third Engineering Officer, an Engineering Officer of the Watch

== See also ==
- First Officer (disambiguation)
