= I/O (disambiguation) =

I/O may refer to:

== Computing ==
- Input/output, a system of communication for information processing systems
- I/O model, a model of computation
- IEC 60417 symbols for power delivery or device activation

== Economics ==
- Input–output model, an economic model of flow prediction between sectors
- Industrial and organizational psychology, the field of psychology that studies the workplace
- Industrial organization, the field of economics that studies the behavior of firms

== Music ==
- i/o (album), an album by Peter Gabriel (2023)
- "i/o" (song), song by Peter Gabriel (2023)
- Input/Output (EP), a 2003 EP by The Letterpress
- I/O, a 2004 album by the Canadian rock band Limblifter
- Input/Output, a contemporary Christian children's song on the 1984 Bill Gaither Trio LP entitled (Ten New Songs With Kids...For Kids About) Life

== Other uses ==
- I/O (visual novel), a Japanese science fiction visual novel by Regista

== See also ==
- IO (disambiguation)
- Google I/O
- Input and output (medicine)
