= First of May =

First of May may refer to:

- May 1, the first day of May
- International Workers' Day, aka Labor Day, chosen by an organization of socialist and communist political parties
- First of May, a village and municipality in Entre Ríos Province of Argentina
- A reference to May Day in the context of a fertility or Spring holiday
- First of May Bookshop, an Edinburgh bookshop that sold LGBT books in the late 1970s - early 1980s
- First of May (1958 film), a French comedy film
- The First of May (1998 film), an American independent film
- First of May (2015 film), Taiwanese film
- "First of May" (Bee Gees song), a 1969 song by the Bee Gees
- "First of May", a 2003 song by Jonathan Coulton from the album Smoking Monkey
- "First of May", poem by Langston Hughes
- First of May, subtitle of Symphony No. 3 by Dmitri Shostakovich
- First of May, A novice performer or worker in their first season. Shows usually play the season's opening spot on the first of May, so the term means someone "green" who is new to circus life.

== See also ==
- Continental Rummy, a game also known as “May I”
- May 1 (Eastern Orthodox liturgics)
- 1º de Mayo (disambiguation)
