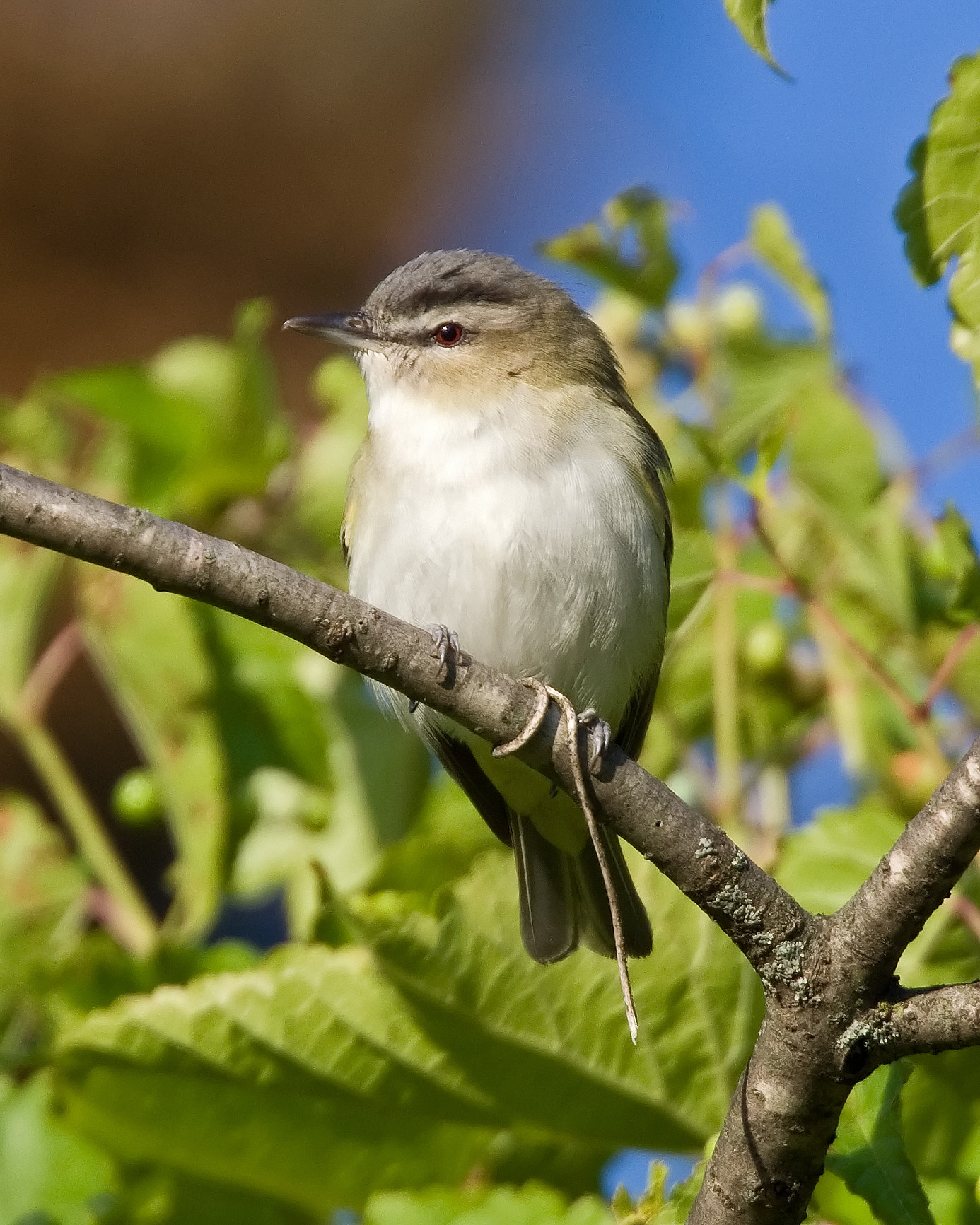
- In Wisconsin, North America

Conservation status
- Least Concern (IUCN 3.1)

Scientific classification
- Kingdom: Animalia
- Phylum: Chordata
- Class: Aves
- Order: Passeriformes
- Family: Vireonidae
- Genus: Vireo
- Species: V. olivaceus

Binomial name
- Vireo olivaceus (Linnaeus, 1766)
- Non-Breeding Breeding Migration

Synonyms
- Muscicapa olivacea Linnaeus, 1766

= Red-eyed vireo =

Species of bird

The red-eyed vireo (Vireo olivaceus) is a small American songbird. It is somewhat warbler-like but not closely related to the New World warblers (Parulidae). Common across its vast range, this species is not considered threatened by the IUCN.

Vireo is a Latin word referring to a green migratory bird, perhaps the female golden oriole, possibly the European greenfinch. The specific olivaceus is Neo-Latin for 'olive-green', from Latin oliva ('olive').

== Description and systematics ==
Adults are mainly olive-green on the upper parts with white underparts; they have a red iris and a grey crown edged with black. There is a dark blackish line through the eyes and a wide white stripe just above that line. They have thick blue-grey legs and a stout bill. They are yellowish on the flanks and undertail coverts (though this is faint in some populations).

In the past, the yellow-green vireo (V. flavoviridis), the chivi vireo (V. chivi), and the Noronha vireo (V. gracilirostris) have been considered to be conspecific with the red-eyed vireo; the chivi vireo was split most recently. Other closely related species include the black-whiskered vireo (V. altiloquus) and the Yucatan vireo (V. magister).

Measurements:

Both sexes:

- Length: 4.7–5.1 in (12–13 cm)
- Weight: 0.4–0.9 oz (12–26 g)
- Wingspan: 9.1-9.8 in (23–25 cm)

== Song ==
Song

Red-eyed vireos are one of the most prolific singers in the bird world. They usually sing high up in trees for long periods of time in a question-and-answer rhythm. This species holds the record for most songs given in a single day among bird species, with more than 20,000 songs in one day.

Songs generally consist of 1–5 syllables between 2 and 6 kHz. Songs are usually spaced 0.8–1 seconds apart, although at times they may sing at a slower or faster rate. Red-eyed vireos have a large repertoire, with one study finding an average of 31.4 song types per bird and one individual singing 73 different song types.

== Ecology ==
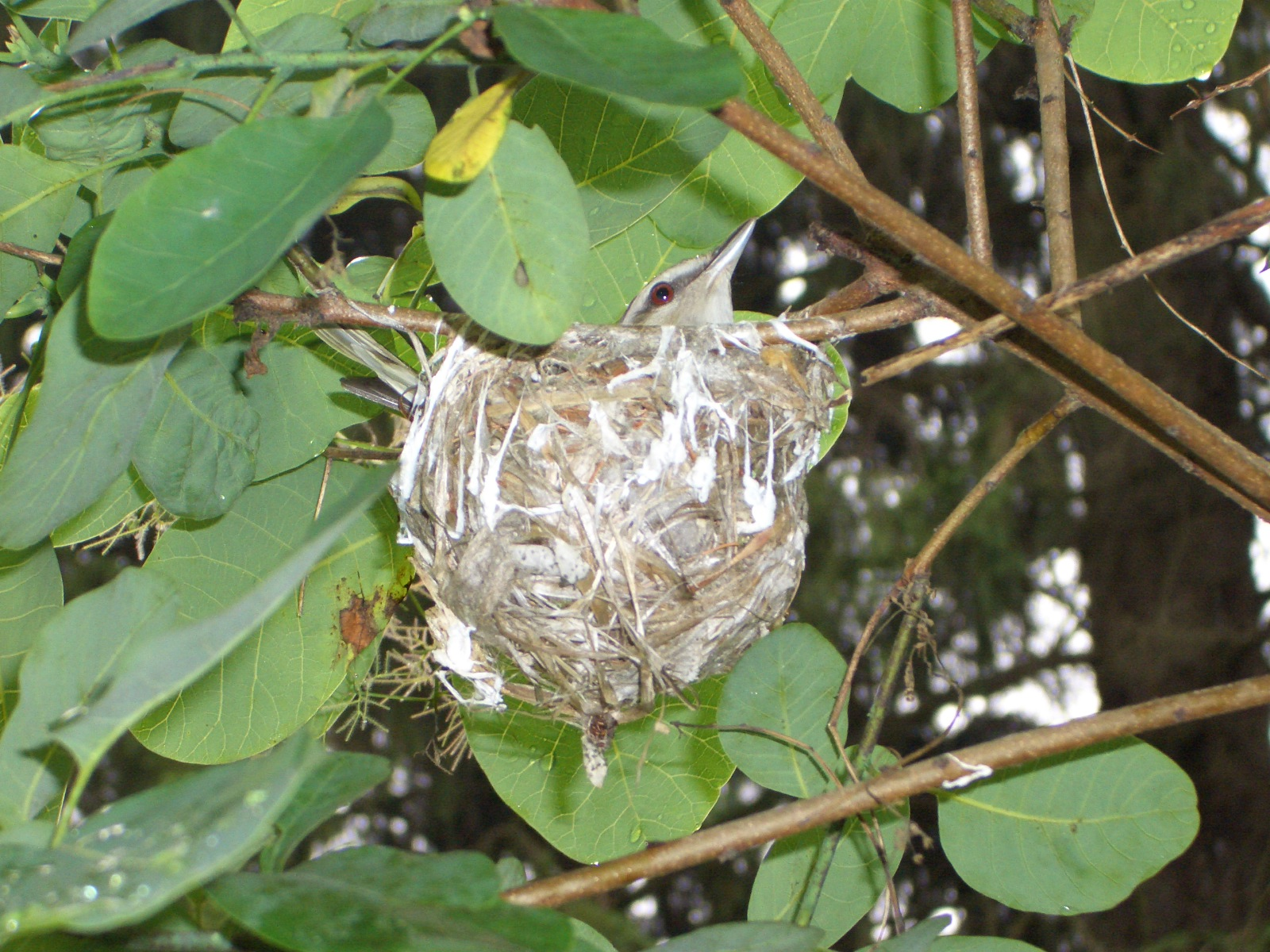
Bird in nest, Cook Forest State Park (Pennsylvania). Photo by Vernon R. Martin

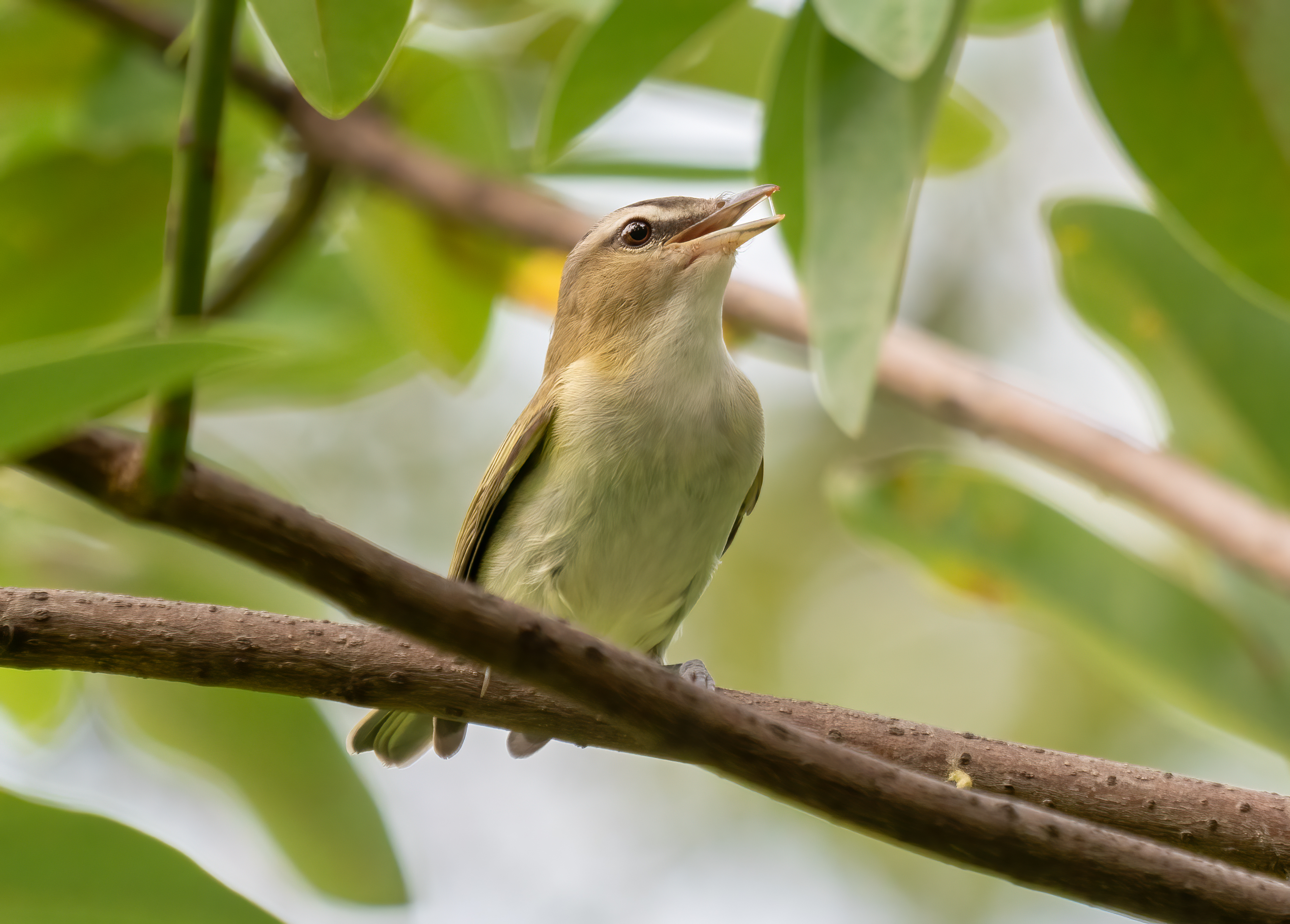
Vocalizing red-eyed vireo

The breeding habitat of the red-eyed vireo is in the open wooded areas across Canada and the eastern and northwestern United States. These birds migrate to South America, where they spend the winter. Latin American and Mexico are important migratory stopovers, but are not home to permanent populations of red-eyed vireo as it is an exclusively migratory species. Migration primarily occurs in May and September, although interestingly populations that breed in the Northwest boreal forest will migrate east first before beginning their southern migration.

Following a trend seen in other bird species, red-eyed vireo have been altering there migration timing forward due to climate change. It is unclear if this is having some affect on their breeding success.

In their summer range they are primarily insectavores, using a high protein diet to fuel their young and build fat reserves for their eventual migration south. Red-eyed vireos glean insects from tree foliage, primarily favoring caterpillars, beetles, and aphids, that they sometimes snatch while hovering.

In their wintering quarters they are almost exclusively frugivores, where trees bearing fruit, such as tamanqueiro (Alchornea glandulosa) or gumbo-limbo (Bursera simaruba), will attract them to parks and gardens. Birds are often quite acrobatic when reaching for fruit, even hanging upside down to get specific berries. In some tropical regions they are seen attending mixed-species feeding flocks.

The nest is a cup in a fork of a tree branch. The red-eyed vireo suffers from nest parasitism by the brown-headed cowbird (Molothrus ater), and is among the most common hosts for this species. Parasitism by Haemoproteus and trypanosoma might affect these birds rather frequently, as was noted in studies of birds caught in Parque Nacional de La Macarena and near Turbo (Colombia): though only three red-eyed vireos were examined, all were infected with at least one of these parasites.

== Vagrancy ==
The red-eyed vireo is a visitor to some western states, especially California. This vireo is one of the more frequent American passerine vagrants to Europe, with more than one hundred records, mainly in Ireland and Great Britain.
