= Zero1 =

Zero1 may refer to:

- ZERO1 (nonprofit), a non-profit organization
- Pro Wrestling Zero1, a Japanese professional wrestling promotion founded in 2001
- Zero 1, a rock band featuring Hal Sparks
- Zero1, a mobile virtual network operator in Singapore; see List of mobile network operators of the Asia Pacific region
- Zero1 Agency, an advertising & marketing agency that's headquartered in Los Angeles, California and was founded in 2014
- Zero 1, a digital model railway control system from Hornby Railways

== See also ==
- Zero one (disambiguation)
- 01 (disambiguation)
