= Mount Iō =

Mount Iō also Mount Iwo may refer to:

- Mount Iō (Akan), in Akan National Park in Hokkaidō
- Mount Iō (Iōjima), in Kagoshima prefecture on the island of Iōjima
- Mount Iō (Shiretoko), in Shiretoko National Park in Hokkaidō
- Mount Iō (Yatsugatake), in the Southern Yatsugatake Volcanic Group of the Yatsugatake Mountains in Honshū
- Iozen, a mountain on the border of Ishikawa and Toyama
