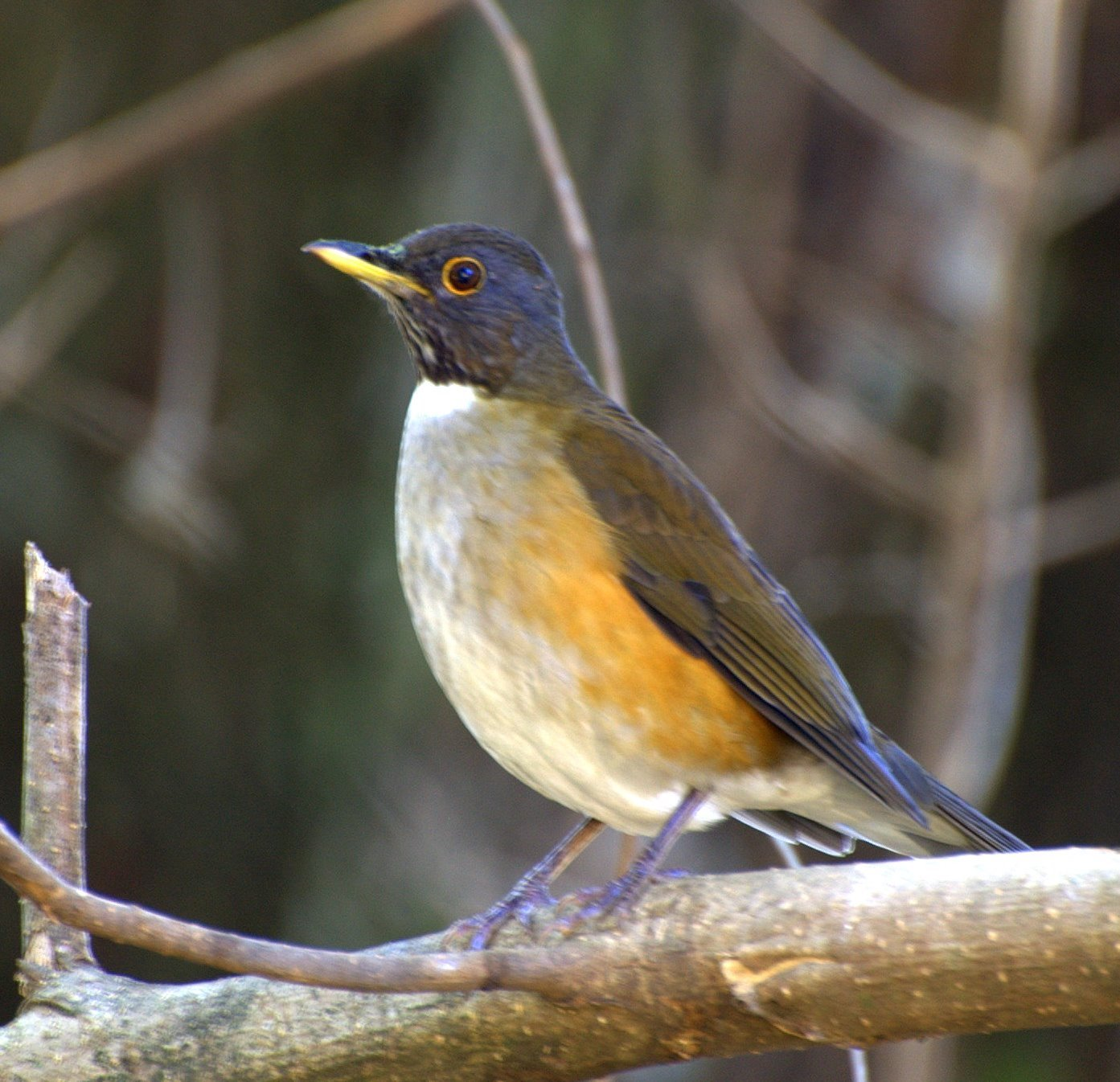
- The nominate subspecies in the São Paulo Forest Gardens, Brazil
- Turdus albicollis song recorded in humid primary forest, Napo Province, Ecuador

Conservation status
- Least Concern (IUCN 3.1)

Scientific classification
- Kingdom: Animalia
- Phylum: Chordata
- Class: Aves
- Order: Passeriformes
- Family: Turdidae
- Genus: Turdus
- Species: T. albicollis

Binomial name
- Turdus albicollis Vieillot, 1818
- Range of white-necked thrush

= White-necked thrush =

Species of bird

The white-necked thrush (Turdus albicollis) is a species of bird in the family Turdidae. It is found on Trinidad and Tobago and in every mainland South American country except Chile. It previously was called the white-necked robin.

== Taxonomy and systematics ==
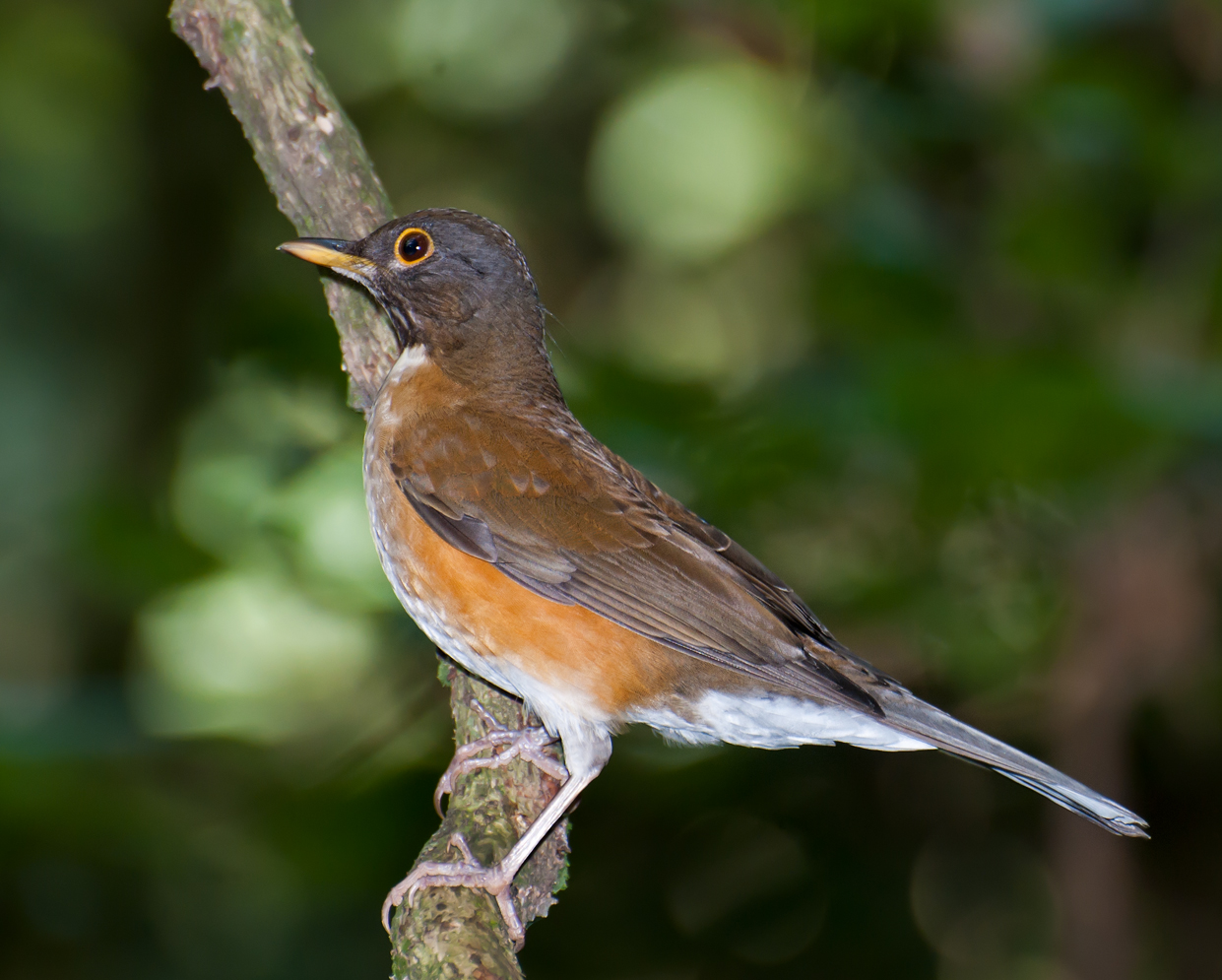

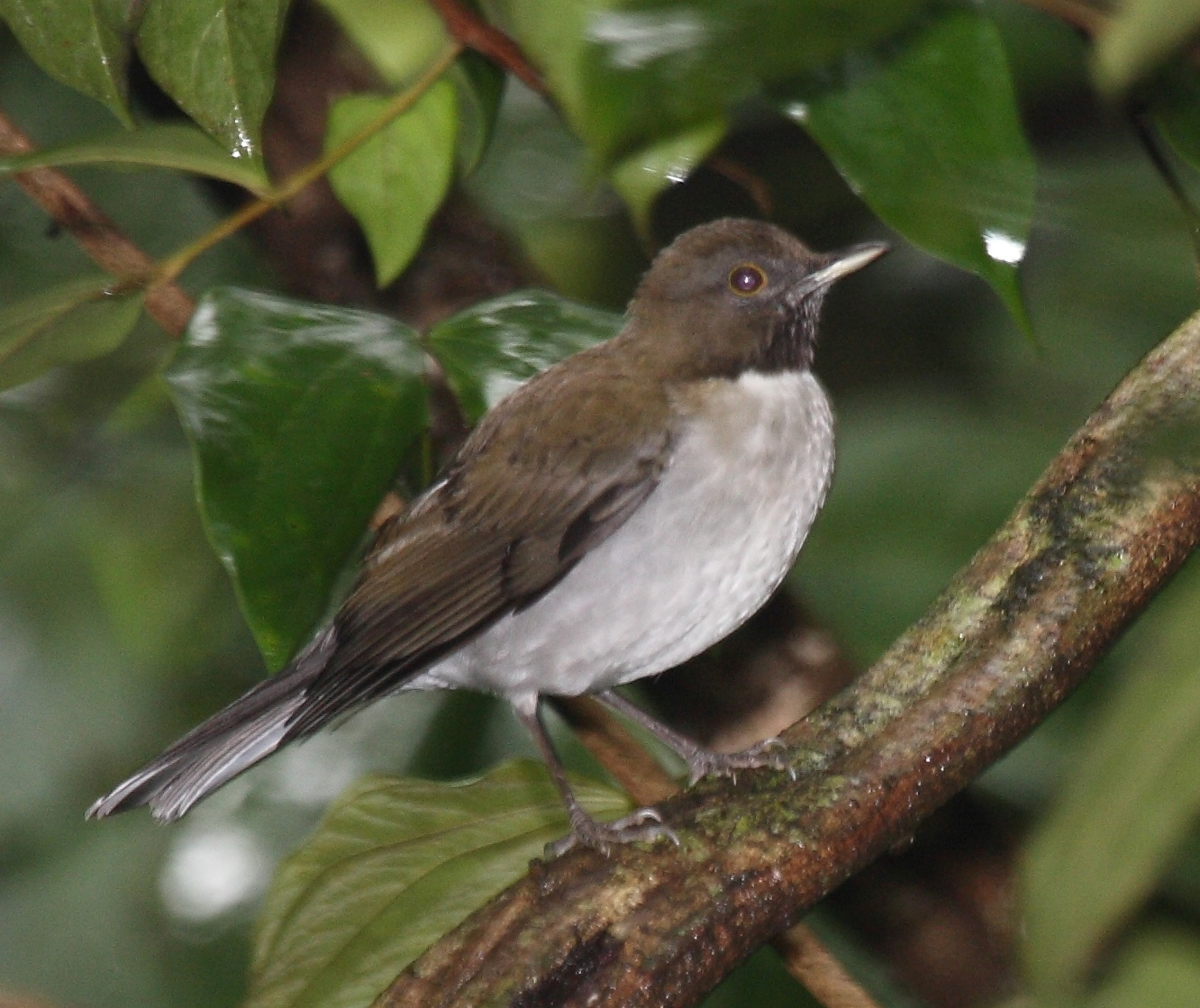
The albicollis group ("rufous-flanked thrush") above and phaeopygos group ("gray-flanked thrush") below

The white-necked thrush was originally described in 1818 with its current binomial Turdus albicollis.

The species' further taxonomy is complicated and as of early 2026 remains unsettled. For much of the twentieth century what are now the white-throated thrush (T. assimilis) and Dagua thrush (T. daguae) were included as subspecies of the white-necked thrush. The North American Classification Committee of the American Ornithological Society (NACC) recognized the white-necked and white-throated thrushes as separate species in the first edition of its "Checklist of North American Birds". BirdLife International's Handbook of the Birds of the World (HBW) split them its Version 0, issued in 2007. What is now the independent South American Classification Committee (SACC) had done so by 2007. By 2018 the IOC had adopted the split and the Clements taxonomy followed in 2025. AviList adopted it in its first version (2025). When they made the split, the IOC, Clements, the NACC, and the SACC included daguae in the white-throated thrush. By 2018 the IOC had recognized daguae as a separate species and Clements followed in 2025. The NACC recognized the split in 2025 and the SACC in 2026. AviList recognized it in its first version. However, HBW included daguae within the white-necked thrush and as of early 2026 retains it there.

The IOC, Clements, and the SACC assign these seven subspecies to the white-necked thrush: As noted above, HBW also includes T. a. daguae in this species.

- T. a. phaeopygoides Seebohm, 1881
- T. a. phaeopygus Cabanis, 1849
- T. a. spodiolaemus Berlepsch & Stolzmann, 1896
- T. a. contemptus Hellmayr, 1902
- T. a. crotopezus Lichtenstein, MHC, 1823
- T. a. albicollis Vieillot|, 1818
- T. a. paraguayensis (Chubb, C, 1910)

The Clements taxonomy recognizes two groups within the species based on their flank colors:

White-necked thrush (gray-flanked) Turdus albicollis (phaeopygus group)

- T. a. phaeopygoides
- T. a. phaeopygus
- T. a. spodiolaemus

White-necked thrush (rufous-flanked) Turdus albicollis (albicollis group)

- T. a. contemptus
- T. a. crotopezus
- T. a. albicollis
- T. a. paraguayensis

In early 2026 the SACC split the two groups, calling T. phaeopygus (with phaeopygoides and spodiolaemus) the "gray-flanked thrush" and T. albicollis (with the remaining three subspecies) the "rufous-flanked thrush", mirroring the Clements group names.

This article follows the IOC et al. one-species, seven-subspecies model.

== Description ==
The white-necked thrush is 20.5 to 26 cm (8.1 to 10 in) long and weighs 40 to 84.5 g (1.4 to 3.0 oz). The sexes have the same plumage. Adults of the nominate subspecies T. a. albicollis have a blackish brown head with a blackish-streaked white throat and a yellow to orange eye-ring. Their upperparts, wings, and tail are dark brown. They have a white crescent below the throat, a buff-gray breast and upper belly, brown-washed orangey flanks, and a white lower belly and undertail coverts. They have a brown iris, a yellowish bill, and pinkish brown legs and feet. Juveniles resemble adults with buff flecks on the head, faint wing bars of orange spots, and buffy underparts with brown barring.

The other subspecies differ from the nominate and each other thus:

- T. a. phaeopygoides: darker and more olive upperparts than nominate, buffish gray breast and flanks, and reddish eye-ring
- T. a. phaeopygus: like phaeopygoides with browner upperparts and yellow eye-ring
- T. a. spodiolaemus like phaeopygoides with more rufous olive upperparts and heavier throat streaks
- T. a. contemptus: brighter upperparts than nominate with dull gray breast and belly and tawny flanks
- T. a. crotopezus: dull gray breast and belly and tawny flanks
- T. a. paraguayensis: much like nominate with orange-brown flanks and heavier throat streaks

== Distribution and habitat ==
The white-necked thrush has a disjunct distribution. The subspecies are found thus:

- T. a. phaeopygoides: Trinidad and Tobago; Venezuelan Coastal Range from Carabobo to Miranda; Serranía del Perijá on the Venezuela-Colombia border; and Andes from Venezuela's Barinas southwest into northeastern Colombia
- T. a. phaeopygus: from eastern Colombia east through Venezuela's Amazonas and Bolívar states, the Guianas, and northern Amazonian Brazil
- T. a. spodiolaemus: from southeastern Colombia south through eastern Ecuador and eastern Peru into northern Bolivia and from there east into western Brazil
- T. a. contemptus: southern Bolivia and slightly into southwestern Peru
- T. a. crotopezus: eastern Brazil from Alagoas south to Espírito Santo
- T. a. albicollis: southeastern Brazil from Rio de Janeiro state south into central and eastern Uruguay
- T. a. paraguayensis: from Mato Grosso in Brazil south through eastern Paraguay into northeastern Argentina's Misiones and Corrientes provinces

The white-necked thrush inhabits the interior, edges, and clearings of several forest types. It favors terra firme and also is found in várzea and mature secondary forest. It seldom is found in open areas but will come out of cover onto trails and roadsides. It ranges in elevation up to 2,600 m (8,500 ft) in Colombia, 1,100 m (3,600 ft) in Ecuador, 1,300 m (4,300 ft) in Peru, 1,900 m (6,200 ft) in Venezuela, and 1,500 m (4,900 ft) in Brazil.

== Behavior ==
=== Movement ===
The white-necked thrush is almost entirely a year-round resident. However, some elevational movements have been noted in Brazil. In addition, T. a. contemptus is apparently partially migratory into western Bolivia and southwestern Peru in the austral winter.

=== Feeding ===
The white-necked thrush feeds on insects, other invertebrates like worms, fruit, berries, and seeds. It forages mostly on the ground but in trees up to the forest's mid-story for fruit. It regularly attends swarms of army ants. It does not join mixed-species feeding flocks.

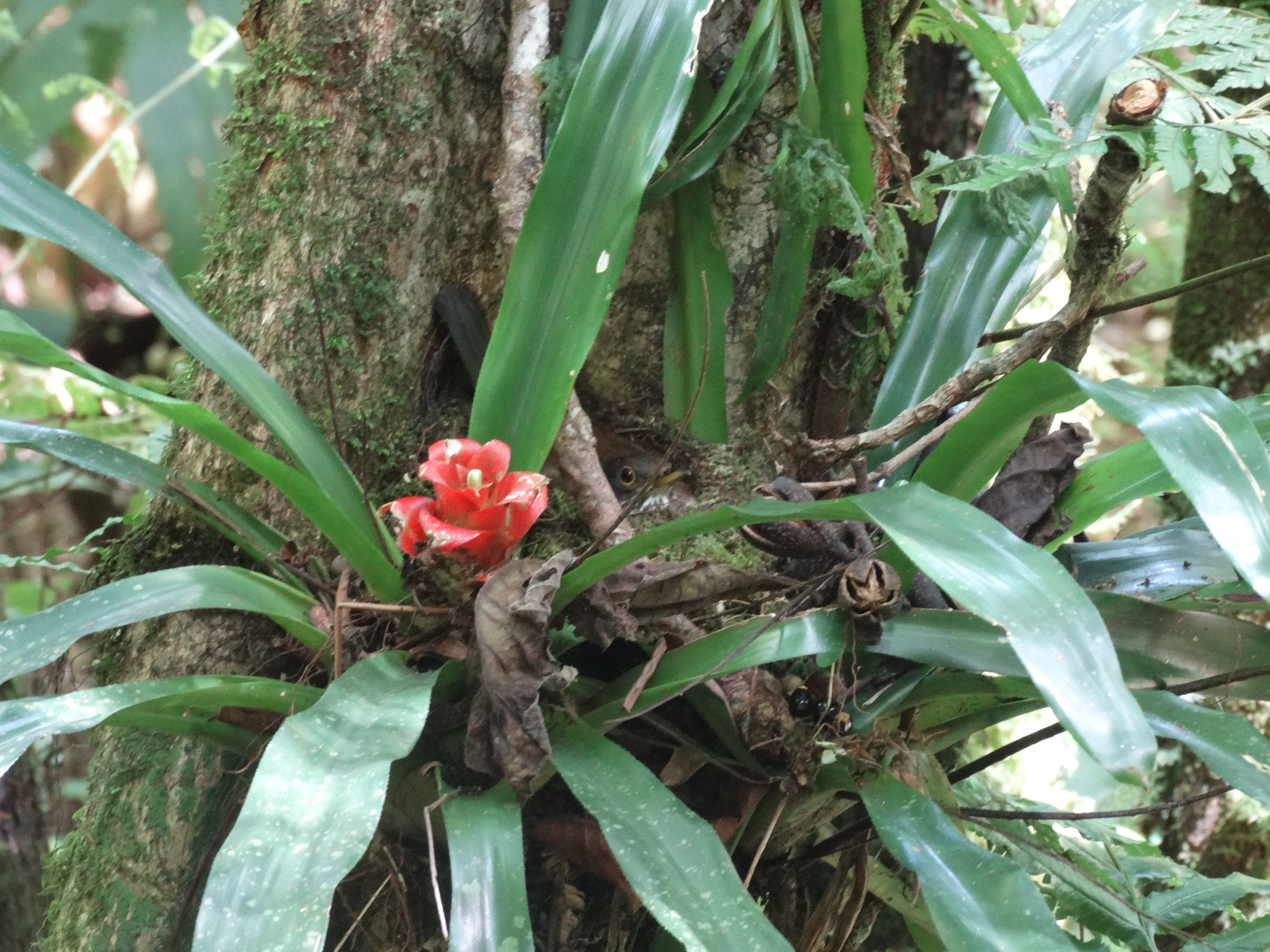
White-necked thrush at its nest

=== Breeding ===
The white-necked thrush's breeding season varies geographically. In Trinidad and Tobago it spans November to August with a peak in March to June. It includes May to June in Colombia, March in Ecuador, April to June in Venezuela, apparently December to May in Suriname, and apparently October to March in French Guiana. The species' nest is a bulky cup made from mud, leaves, and twigs with moss on the outside and a lining of rootlets. Nests have been found in trees, variously on a stump, in a branch hollow, and against the trunk. They have also been found on small palms, within epiphytes, and on earthen banks. Typically they are about 1 to 9 m (3 to 30 ft) above the ground. The clutch is two or three eggs that are pale blue or pale greenish blue with darker spots. The incubation period is about 12 to 13 days. The time to fledging is not known. The female alone incubates the clutch and both parents provision nestlings. The white-necked thrush is socially monogamous but extra-pair mating is common.

=== Vocalization ===
"The White-necked Thrush has a melodious song that varies somewhat across its broad range. While foraging it also produces a variety of abrupt calls." In Venezuela its song is written as "churrwerr . . eeerrr . . weeerr . . eerr's . .; the paired, sing-song phrase are hypnotic...and are not identical to each other". There its alarm call is "a rough jjig-wig or jjig-wig-wig". Another description of its song is "a slow, low-pitched, rich caroling with relatively little within-song variation: reewur-CHEE wuur-CHEE reewur-CHEE djer wuur-CHEED..." and its calls "a low kirk and a rising rheer, sometimes followed by rising notes: rheer-ree-ree?".

== Status ==
The IUCN follows HBW taxonomy and so has included daguae in its assessment of the white-necked thrush. It has assessed the species as being of Least Concern. It has an extremely large range; its population size is not known and is believed to be decreasing. No immediate threats have been identified. The species is considered fairly common in Colombia and Ecuador. In Peru T. a. spodiolaemus is "uncommon to fairly common" but T. a. contemptus is rare. It is "uncommon to locally fairly common" in Venezuela and "frequent to uncommon" in Brazil. It is very common the Guianan interior but more local on the coast; common in Trinidad and Tobago, rare to uncommon in Paraguay, and rare in Uruguay.
