= I0 =

I0 or I-0 (the letter "I" followed by the digit "0", zero) may refer to:

- Axiom I0, a rank-into-rank axiom in set theory
- I-0 (video game), a piece of interactive fiction written by Adam Cadre

== See also ==
- IO (disambiguation) (the letter "I" followed by the letter "O")
- 10 (disambiguation) (the digit "1" followed by the digit "0")
- 1O (disambiguation) (the digit "1" followed by the letter "O")
- 0I (disambiguation) (the digit "0" followed by the letter "I")
