= Ol Onal (Unicode block) =

- Range: U+1E5D0..U+1E5FF (48 code points)
- Plane: SMP
- Scripts: Ol Onal
- Assigned: 44 code points
- Unused: 4 reserved code points

Unicode Version History
- 16.0 (2024): 44 (+44)

Unicode documentation
- Code chart ∣ Web page

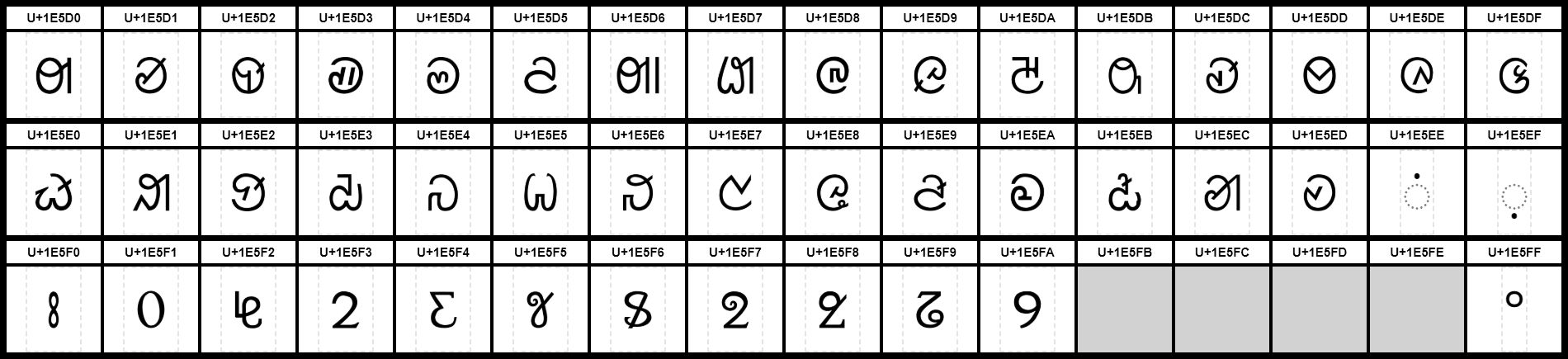
Graphical representation of the Ol Onal Unicode block

Ol Onal is a Unicode block containing letters for the Ol Onal alphabet, created between 1981 and 1992 to write the Bhumij language.

Ol Onal^{[1]}^{[2]} Official Unicode Consortium code chart (PDF)
	0	1	2	3	4	5	6	7	8	9	A	B	C	D	E	F
U+1E5Dx	𞗐	𞗑	𞗒	𞗓	𞗔	𞗕	𞗖	𞗗	𞗘	𞗙	𞗚	𞗛	𞗜	𞗝	𞗞	𞗟
U+1E5Ex	𞗠	𞗡	𞗢	𞗣	𞗤	𞗥	𞗦	𞗧	𞗨	𞗩	𞗪	𞗫	𞗬	𞗭	𞗮	𞗯
U+1E5Fx	𞗰	𞗱	𞗲	𞗳	𞗴	𞗵	𞗶	𞗷	𞗸	𞗹	𞗺					𞗿
Notes 1.As of Unicode version 17.0 2.Grey areas indicate non-assigned code points

== History ==
The following Unicode-related documents record the purpose and process of defining specific characters in the Ol Onal block:

Version	Final code points (Note: Proposed code points and characters names may differ from final code points and names)	Count	L2 ID	Document
16.0	U+1E5D0..1E5FA, 1E5FF	44	L2/22-151R	Mandal, Biswajit; Kučera, Jan (2022-10-25), Proposal to encode the Ol Onal script
16.0	U+1E5D0..1E5FA, 1E5FF	44	L2/22-244	Scherer, Markus; et al. (2022-10-27), "Script1: Ol Onal", UTC #173 properties feedback & recommendations
16.0	U+1E5D0..1E5FA, 1E5FF	44	L2/22-248	Anderson, Deborah; et al. (2022-10-31), "5 Ol Onal", Recommendations to UTC #173 October 2022 on Script Proposals
16.0	U+1E5D0..1E5FA, 1E5FF	44	L2/22-241	Constable, Peter (2022-11-09), "Consensus 173-C26", Approved Minutes of UTC Meeting 173, "Accept 44 Ol Onal characters at U+1E5D0..U+1E5FF"
