= 0L =

0L (zero L) or 0-L may refer to:

- 0 longitude, or the prime meridian
- The zeroth law of thermodynamics
- Zero-length launch, in rocketry
- Zero in the Lebesgue measure
- Zero-lift axis, in aerodynamics
  - Zero-lift drag coefficient
- Zero-length spring, a hypothetical type of spring
- The period between a person being accepted into law school and starting their first year of education (1L)

== See also ==
- L0 (disambiguation)
- OL (disambiguation)
