= Zero one =

Zero One may refer to:

- Zero 1 (band), a band
- "Zero One" (song), a 2018 song by K?d
- "Zero-One", a song by Northlane from the album Mesmer, 2017
- Pro Wrestling Zero1, a Japanese pro wrestling promotion
- Zero-One, the name of the vehicle in the Pokémon Snap video game
- Zero One, the name of the computer-controlled city in the Matrix trilogy
- Kamen Rider Zero-One, a 2019–20 Japanese tokusatsu series
- Zero One (TV series), a 1962-65 British TV series
- Zero One (album), a 2020 album by the Living Tombstone
- Zero One, a manga written by Hiroya Oku
- Zeroone, an album by Mia Doi Todd
- the exact-match loss function, the 0-1 loss

== See also ==
- Zero1 (disambiguation)
- 01 (disambiguation)
