= Dagua thrush =

Scientific classification
- Kingdom: Animalia
- Phylum: Chordata
- Class: Aves
- Order: Passeriformes
- Family: Turdidae
- Genus: Turdus
- Species: T. daguae

Binomial name
- Turdus daguae von Berlepsch, 1897

Synonyms
- See text

Audio
- Song recorded in semi-humid shrubbery in coastal Ecuador

Species of bird

The Dagua thrush (Turdus daguae) is a species of bird in the family Turdidae. It is found in Colombia, Ecuador, and Panama.

== Taxonomy and systematics ==
The Dagua thrush was originally described by Hans von Berlepsch in 1897 with its current binomial Turdus daguae. Berlepsch chose the specific epithet daguae because the type specimen was collected near Dagua, Colombia.

The species' further taxonomy is complicated and as of early 2026 remains unsettled. For much of the twentieth century what is now the Dagua thrush was treated as a subspecies of the white-necked thrush (T. albicollis sensu stricto). In 1998 the North American Classification Committee of the American Ornithological Society (NACC) split the white-throated thrush (T. assimilis) from the white-necked in its first edition of its "Checklist of North American Birds". What is now the independent South American Classification Committee (SACC) had done so by 2007. By 2018 the IOC had adopted the split and the Clements taxonomy followed in 2025. AviList adopted it in its first version (2025). All of them included daguae as a subspecies of the new white-throated thrush. BirdLife International's Handbook of the Birds of the World (HBW) split them its Version 0, issued in 2007. However, it retained daguae as a subspecies of the reduced white-necked thrush.

By 2018 the IOC had split daguae as the Dagua thrush from the white-necked thrush and Clements followed in 2025. The NACC recognized the split in 2025 and the SACC in 2026. AviList adopted it in its first version. However, as of early 2026 HBW retains dague as a subspecies of the white-necked thrush.

This article treats the Dagua thrush as a full species with no subspecies.

== Description ==
The Dagua thrush is 21.5 to 23 cm (8.5 to 9.1 in) long. The sexes have the same plumage. Adults have a slightly reddish dark brown head with a slightly lighter face, a brown-streaked white throat, and a yellow eye-ring. Their upperparts, wings, and tail are slightly reddish-tinged dark brown. They have a white crescent below the throat, a dusky brown breast with often a reddish tinge on the sides and flanks. The center of their belly and their vent are whitish and their undertail coverts whitish to white. They have a brown iris, a blackish bill with a small amount of yellow, and dusky legs and feet that sometimes are slightly pinkish.

== Distribution and habitat ==
The Dagua thrush is found from eastern Darién Province in eastern Panama south through western Colombia and spottily through western Ecuador. It primarily inhabits tropical evergreen forest and deciduous forest in the tropical zone. It is also found in mature secondary forest and cultivated areas. In elevation it ranges from sea level to 1,000 m (3,300 ft) in Colombia and up to 600 m (2,000 ft) in Ecuador.

== Behavior ==
=== Movement ===
The Dagua thrush is a year-round resident.

=== Feeding ===
The Dagua thrush's diet and foraging behavior are not known but are assumed to be similar to those of its former "parents" the white-throated and white-necked thrushes, which respectively see here and here.

=== Breeding ===
The Dagua thrush is thought to breed between January and May. Nothing else is known about its breeding biology though it is assumed to be similar to that of the white-throated and white-necked thrushes, which respectively see here and here.

=== Vocalization ===
The Dagua thrush's song is one of the elements that define it as full species. It is a "continuous series ('caroling') of throaty whistles at rather flat pitch". A typical phrase is five to ten different notes that may be repeated. A song bout may last several minutes or be broken into shorter segments with short pauses between them. Its calls include a "somewhat plaintive...gueeh", a "short downslurred note gyuk" or a "more burry grrk". The species sings mostly between January and May, and mostly in the early morning and again from late afternoon until dusk.

== Status ==
The IUCN follows HBW taxonomy and so has not separately assessed the Dagua thrush but includes it within the assessment of the much-larger-ranging white-necked thrush. It is considered fairly common in Colombia and "uncommon and decidedly local" in Ecuador.
