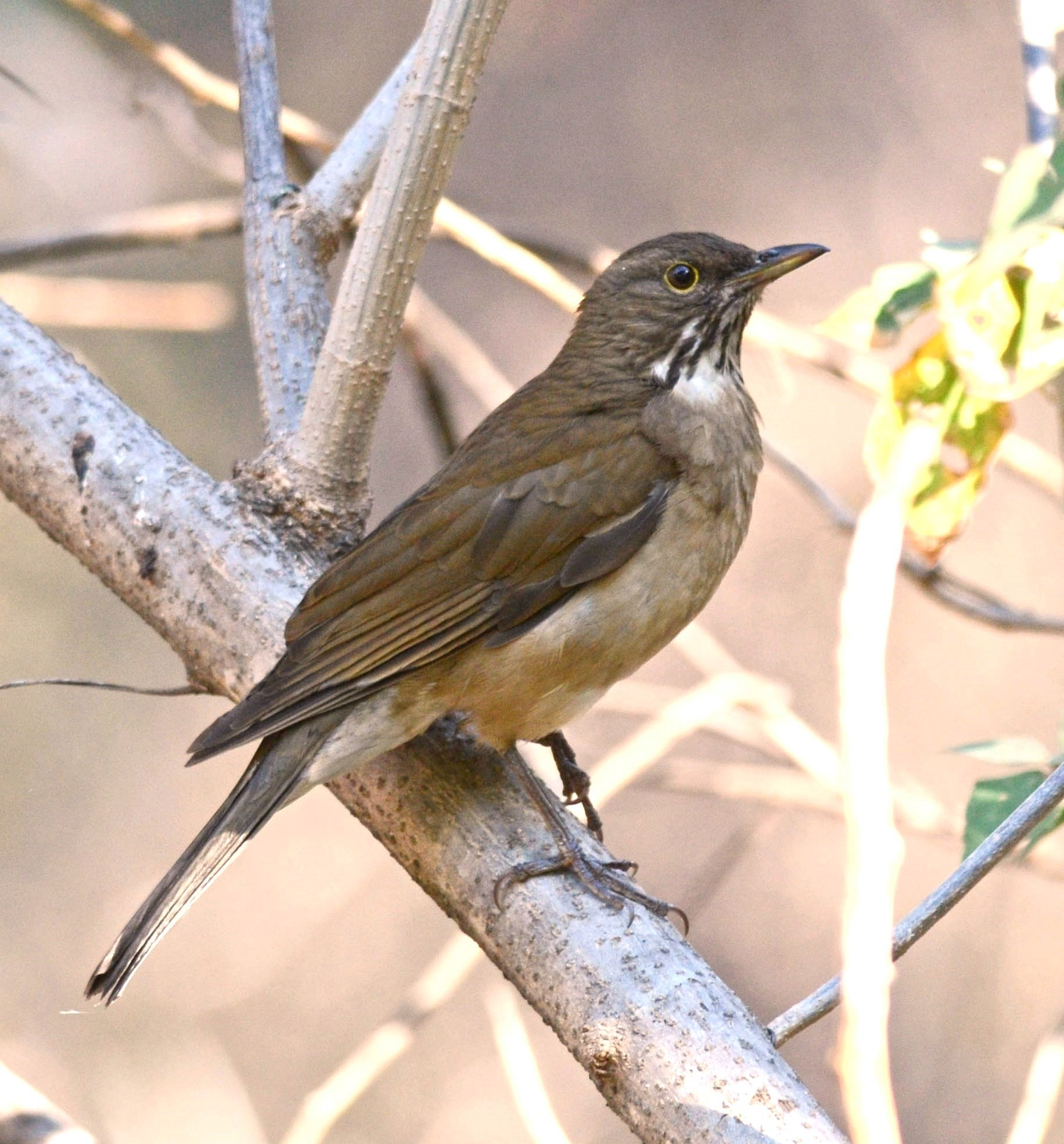

Conservation status
- Least Concern (IUCN 3.1)

Scientific classification
- Kingdom: Animalia
- Phylum: Chordata
- Class: Aves
- Order: Passeriformes
- Family: Turdidae
- Genus: Turdus
- Species: T. assimilis

Binomial name
- Turdus assimilis Cabanis, 1851

= White-throated thrush =

Species of bird

The white-throated thrush (Turdus assimilis) is a species of bird in the family Turdidae. It is found in Mexico and Central America. It also has strayed to the southwestern United States. It previously was called the white-throated robin, a name also used for the Old World species Irania gutturalis.

== Taxonomy and systematics ==
The white-throated thrush was originally described in 1851 with its current binomial Turdus assimilis.

The species' further taxonomy is complicated and as of early 2026 remains unsettled. For much of the twentieth century the white-throated thrush was considered as conspecific with the white-necked thrush (T. albicollis) under the latter English name and binomial. The North American Classification Committee of the American Ornithological Society (NACC) recognized them as separate species in the first edition of its "Checklist of North American Birds". BirdLife International's Handbook of the Birds of the World (HBW) split them its Version 0, issued in 2007. What is now the independent South American Classification Committee (SACC) had done so by 2007. By 2018 the IOC had adopted the split and the Clements taxonomy followed in 2025. AviList adopted it in its first version (2025).

As of early 2026 the IOC, HBW, and AviList assign it these 13 subspecies:

- T. a. calliphthongus Moore, RT, 1937
- T. a. lygrus Oberholser, 1921
- T. a. suttoni Phillips, AR, 1991
- T. a. assimilis Cabanis, 1851
- T. a. leucauchen Sclater, PL, 1859
- T. a. hondurensis Phillips, AR, 1991
- T. a. benti Phillips, AR, 1991
- T. a. rubicundus (Dearborn, 1907)
- T. a. atrotinctus Miller, W & Griscom, 1925
- T. a. cnephosus (Bangs, 1902)
- T. a. campanicola Phillips, AR, 1991
- T. a. croizati Phillips, AR, 1991
- T. a. coibensis Eisenmann, 1950

The Clements taxonomy does not recognize four of the subspecies posited by Philips in 1991, T. a. hondurensis, T. a. benti, T. a. campanicola, and T. a. croizati. It includes hondurensis and benti within T. a. rubicundus and the other two within T. a. cnephosus.

What many taxonomic systems treat as the Dagua thrush (T. daguae) was originally treated as a subspecies of the pre-split white-necked thrush. When the white-necked and white-throated thrushes were separated, the IOC, Clements, the NACC, and the SACC included it as a subspecies of the white-throated. By 2018 the IOC had adopted the split of daguae from the white-necked thrush and Clements followed in 2025. The NACC recognized the split in 2025 and the SACC in 2026. However, HBW included daguae within the white-necked thrush and as of early 2026 retains it there.

This article follows the IOC et al. 13-subspecies model.

== Description ==
The white-throated thrush is 22 to 26.5 cm (8.7 to 10.4 in) long and weighs about 61 to 90 g (2.2 to 3.2 oz). The sexes have the same plumage. Adults of the nominate subspecies T. a. assimilis have a somewhat rusty brown head, upperparts, wings, tail. They have a yellow eye-ring. Their throat is white with dark brown streaks and a white crescent below it. Their breast is pale olive-brown that becomes whitish from the middle of the belly to the vent. Their undertail coverts are white. They have a reddish brown iris, a dark maxilla, a mixed yellow and dark mandible, and dirty yellow legs and feet.

The other subspecies of the white-throated thrush differ from the nominate and each other thus:

- T. a. calliphthongus: paler overall than nominate
- T. a. lygrus: paler but warmer brown than nominate
- T. a. suttoni: paler than nominate; darker crown and back than lygrus
- T. a. leucauchen: blacker upperparts than nominate; darker and browner underparts but less so than rubicundus; bright yellow eye-ring, bill, legs, and feet
- T. a. hondurensis: essentially like rubicundus
- T. a. benti: essentially like rubicundus
- T. a. rubicundus: most reddish brown upperparts of all; darker and browner underparts than nomimate; bright yellow eye-ring, bill, legs, and feet
- T. a. atrotinctus: deep slaty to blackish upperparts and deep gray underparts; bright yellow eye-ring, bill, legs, and feet
- T. a. cnephosus: browner all over than leucauchen; less rusty than nominate; bright yellow eye-ring, bill, legs, and feet
- T. a. campanicola: essentially like cnephosus
- T. a. croizati: essentially like cnephosus
- T. a. coibensis: darker reddish brown upperparts than nominate and rubicundus; mostly dark bill with paler tip

== Distribution and habitat ==
The white-throated thrush has a disjunct distribution. The subspecies are found thus:

- T. a. calliphthongus: northwestern Mexico from southeastern Sonora to northeastern Sinaloa and Chihuahua
- T. a. lygrus: central and southern Mexico
- T. a. suttoni: eastern Mexico
- T. a. assimilis: eastern Mexico from southern Tamaulipas to eastern México, northern Oaxaca, and western Veracruz
- T. a. leucauchen: Gulf/Caribbean slope from Veracruz south through Belize, Guatemala, and Honduras into north-central Nicaragua
- T. a. hondurensis: central Honduras
- T. a. benti: southwestern El Salvador
- T. a. rubicundus: Pacific slope of Guatemala and El Salvador
- T. a. atrotinctus: Caribbean side of Honduras and northern Nicaragua
- T. a. cnephosus: southwestern Costa Rica into western Panama's Chiriquí and Veraguas provinces
- T. a. campanicola: central Panama
- T. a. croizati: Azuero Peninsula in south-central Panama
- T. a. coibensis: Coiba Island and nearby islets off western Panama

White-throated thrushes have also been documented in the United States, 18 times in Texas since the country's first in 1990 and twice in Arizona.

The white-throated thrush's habitat varies geographically and between the breeding and non-breeding seasons. Overall it generally occurs in wooded habitats. In much of Mexico it is found year-round in somewhat arid to humid landscapes of coniferous, deciduous, and evergreen forest and also in plantations. In Sonora, however, it breeds in gallery forest in canyons and along more open watercourses; the common element is moist shaded undergrowth. In Belize is breeds in humid broadleaf forest and in El Salvador in humid tropical forest. In Costa Rica it primarily is in primary and mature secondary forest but also gallery forest in canyons, brushy savanna and pastures, palm groves, coffee plantations, and canebrakes. The subspecies on Coiba Island inhabits dry tropical forest in the lowlands and sometimes at the edge of mangrove stands. In the non-breeding season the migratory populations seem to favor more open landscapes such as savanna, hedgerows, gardens, and younger secondary forest; here the common element is fruiting trees. In Mexico it ranges in elevation from near sea level to 3,000 m (9,800 ft). In northern Central America it is found up to 2,100 m (6,900 ft) but is usually below 750 m (2,500 ft). In Costa Rica it ranges between 800 and 1,800 m (2,600 and 5,900 ft).

== Behavior ==
=== Movement ===
The white-throated thrush is a partial migrant. In Sonora it moves from the breeding habitat into more open country. Across much of its range it makes elevational movements, usually to lower areas in the non-breeding season.

=== Feeding ===
The white-throated thrush feeds on fruit, insects, and other invertebrates such as worms. It typically forages near or on the ground but will ascend into fruiting trees. In the breeding season it typically forages in pairs. During the non-breeding season is often is in small flocks that may include several species. It occasionally attends army ant swarms.

=== Breeding ===
The white-throated thrush appears to breed between March and July in most or all of its range. It makes a bulky open cup nest from mud and vegetation covered with moss and lined with finer plant fibers. It is placed in shrubs, small trees, cane, or bamboo, and typically is between about 1 and 9 m (3 and 30 ft) above the ground. The clutch is two to three eggs that are dull white to pale blue heavily spotted with brown or gray. The incubation period is 12 to 13 days and fledging occurs about 14 days after hatch. Both parents provision nestlings.

=== Vocalization ===
The white-throated thrush sings mostly between February and August and only seldom during the rest of the year. It sings throughout the morning and again in late afternoon, from a perch in the forest canopy. There is some variation among the subspecies' songs but in most cases they appear very similar; the variations have not been studied deeply. The outlier is T. a. coibensis; its song is noticeably different from those of the other subspecies. The white-throated thrush is a "talented vocalist that sings surprisingly varied phrases ranging from tuneful whistles to thin trills, all typically given in couplets". In northern Central America its song is a "long varied series of well-spaced, sweet clear whistled phrases: chaao-sit!-peer!-tleeet-pip'pip-peeeer!-seeet!-weeeer!-peeer'peeer'peeer given over several minutes". It also makes "a dry che'che'che'che and in flight a thin ssi".

== Status ==
The IUCN has assessed the white-throated thrush as being of Least Concern. It has a large range; its population size is not known and is believed to be decreasing. No immediate threats have been identified. It is considered uncommon in northern Central America, and in Costa Rica fairly common on the Pacific slope and very uncommon on the Caribbean slope.
