= Ol Onal =

Alphabetic script of Bhumij language

Ol Onal script 𞗘𞗪𞗢𞗑𞗜𞗥𞗰
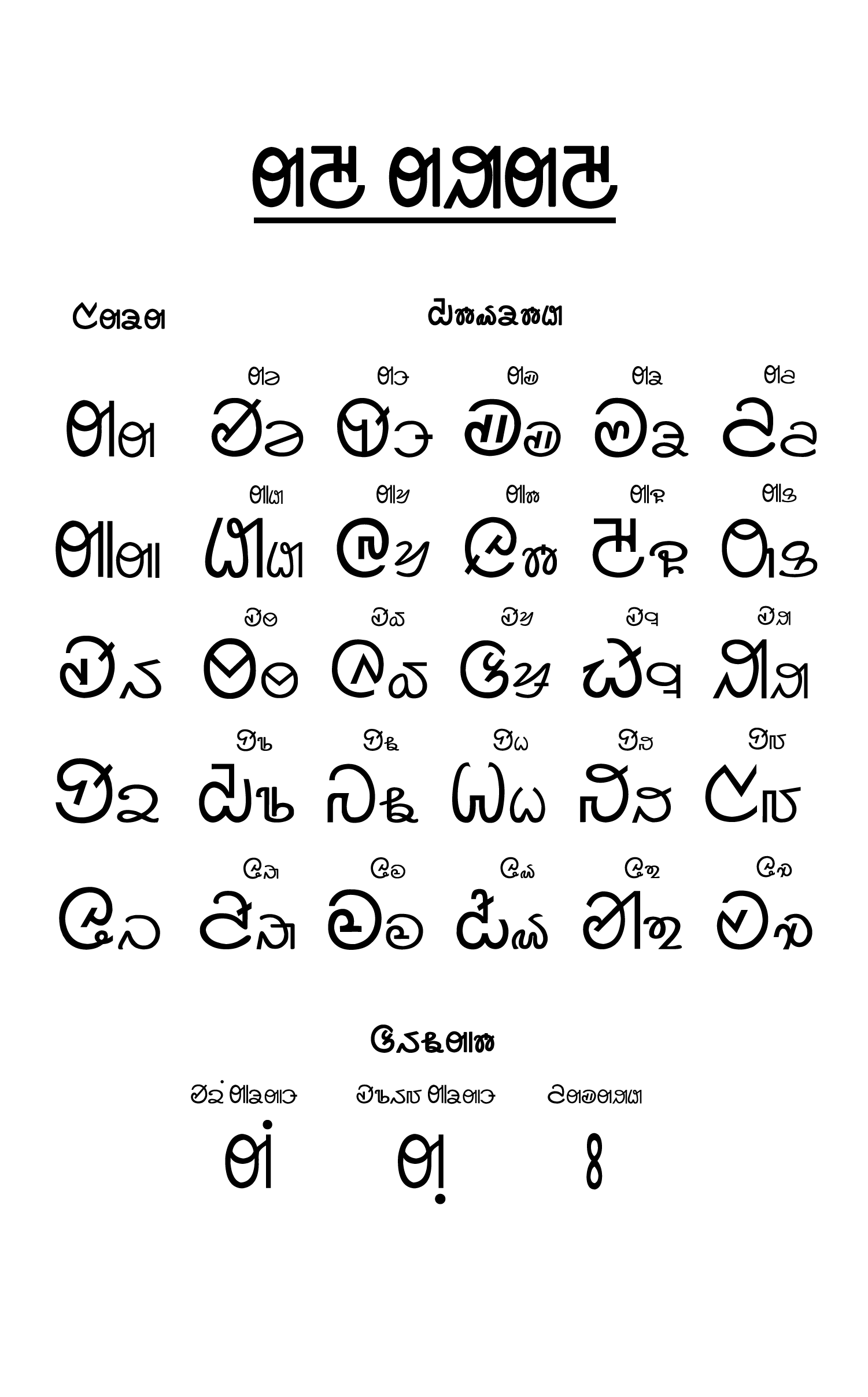
- Ol Onal Alphabet Chart with both Uppercase and Lowercase characters, divided into vowels, consonants and tone markers.
- Script type: Alphabet
- Creator: Mahendra Nath Sardar
- Period: 1981-present
- Direction: Left-to-right
- Region: Odisha, Jharkhand, West Bengal, Assam (India)
- Languages: Bhumij

ISO 15924
- ISO 15924: Onao (296), Ol Onal

Unicode
- Unicode alias: Ol Onal
- Unicode range: U+1E5D0–U+1E5FF

The Ol Onal, also known as Bhumij Lipi or Bhumij Onal, is an alphabetic writing system for the Bhumij language. Ol Onal script was created between 1981 and 1992 by Ol Guru Mahendra Nath Sardar. Ol Onal script is used to write the Bhumij language in some parts of West Bengal, Jharkhand, Orissa, and Assam.

== Language ==
Bhumij is a language of the North Munda group of the Austroasiatic languages, spoken mainly in the Indian states of Jharkhand, Odisha and West Bengal. It is spoken by around 100,000 people in India. The language is closely related to Mundari (mutually intelligible with it but with many dialectal differences), Ho, and Santali.

== History ==
The Bhumij community had no written language, and knowledge was transmitted orally from one generation to another. Later researchers started to use Devanagari, Bengali, and Odia scripts to document the Bhumij language. However, Bhumijs did not have their own script.

The Ol Onal script was created in between 1981 and 1992 by Mahendra Nath Sardar for writing Bhumij in India. It was initially designed by Sardar as a bicameral script, where the lowercase letters were known as Galang Onal, however only the capital letters called Ol Onal have been used for teaching and printed books. Sardar wrote many text books in the script (using only Ol Onal capital letters), but there's no known record of Sardar's Galang Onal lowercase letters (which are very different from the taught capitals) ever being used in publications, except in the script author's personal design manuscripts, with various tried variants that Sardar did not promote for wide use in the Bhumij community.

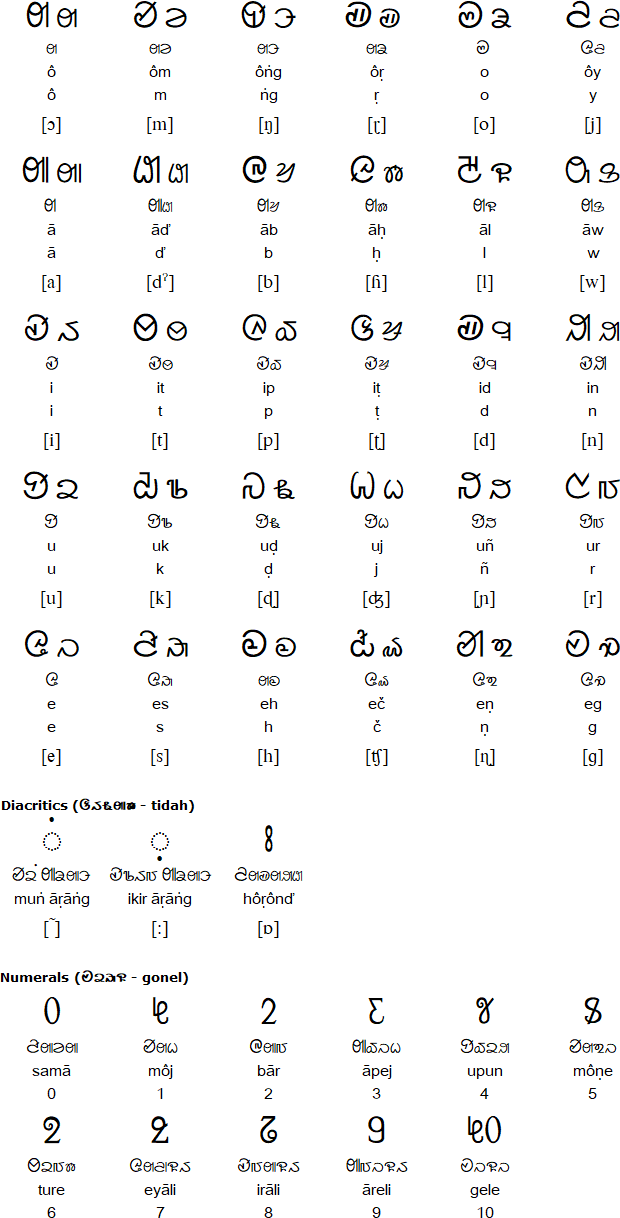
The Ol Onal and Galang Onal scripts, with their transcriptions.

== Structure ==
Ol Onal is written from left to right and behaves as a regular alphabet, and not like the typical abugidas used for other Indic scripts: the 6 basic vowels and 24 basic consonants are simply written as standalone letters, and the consonants do not have any inherent vowel. So there's no vowel killer (or halant) and no need to form complex clusters or to contextually change the letter forms in ligatures for initial or grouped vowels, and final or grouped consonants. (The Ol Chiki alphabet has a similar structure).

There are three additional signs (referred to as ṭiḍaḥ): the nasalisation sign mu (or mun arang [˜], a dot diacritic used above vowel letters), the lengthening sign ikir (or ikir arang [ː], a dot diacritic used only below the vowel letter a [ɔ], where it can occur simultaneously with the nasalisation sign mu), and hoddond (a special sign occurring only after the consonant letters ab [b] and uj [ʤ] to indicate glottalisation [ɒ]).

The script also includes ten decimal digits, and an additional abbreviation sign (a small ring above the baseline, at the middle height of letters and digits).

== Letters ==
Ol Onal consists of 30 letters, including 6 basic vowels and 24 basic consonants.

𞗐 ô IPA: /ɔ/	𞗑 ôm IPA: /m/	𞗒 ôṅg IPA: /ŋ/	𞗓 ôṛ IPA: /ɽ/	𞗔 o IPA: /o/	𞗕 ôy IPA: /j/
𞗖 ā IPA: /a/	𞗗 āď IPA: /dˀ/	𞗘 āb IPA: /b/	𞗙 āḥ IPA: /ɦ/	𞗚 āl IPA: /l/	𞗛 āw IPA: /w/
𞗜 i IPA: /i/	𞗝 it IPA: /t/	𞗞 ip IPA: /p/	𞗟 iṭ IPA: /ʈ/	𞗠 id IPA: /d/	𞗡 in IPA: /n/
𞗢 u IPA: /u/	𞗣 uk IPA: /k/	𞗤 uḍ IPA: /ɖ/	𞗥 uj IPA: /ʤ/	𞗦 uñ IPA: /ɲ/	𞗧 ur IPA: /r/
𞗨 e IPA: /e/	𞗩 es IPA: /s/	𞗪 eh IPA: /h/	𞗫 eč IPA: /ʧ/	𞗬 eṇ IPA: /ɳ/	𞗭 eg IPA: /g/

== Numerals ==
Ol Onal has its own set of decimal digits (0–9) that function identically to standard Western numerals.

0 𞗱 samā	1 𞗲 môj	2 𞗳 bār	3 𞗴 āpej	4 𞗵 upun	5 𞗶 môṇe	6 𞗷 ture	7 𞗸 eyāli	8 𞗹 irāli	9 𞗺 āreli	10 𞗲𞗱 gele

The original digit designs differed in form; however, when the first digital fonts were developed in 2013, these shapes were modified due to technical limitations in accurately rendering the original designs.

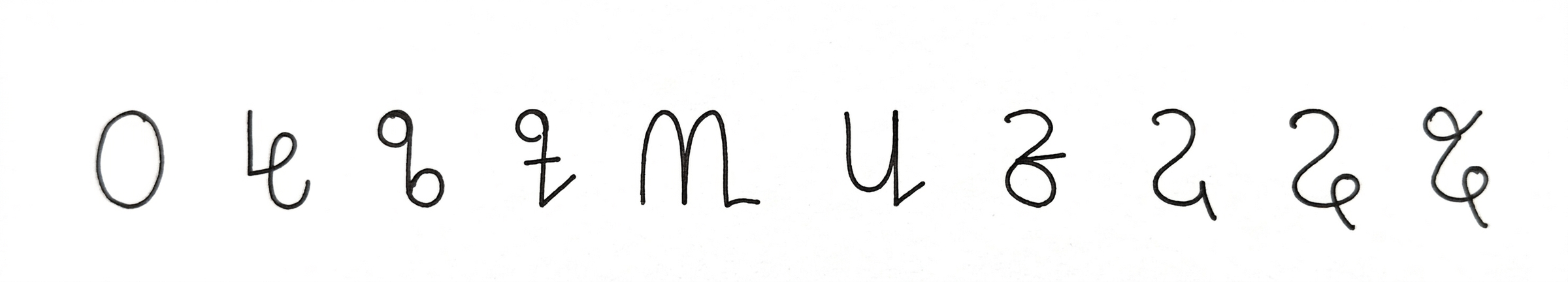
Original digits designed by Mahendra Nath Sardar in 1981–92.

== Unicode ==
Ol Onal was added to the Unicode Standard in September, 2024 with the release of version 16.0.

The Unicode block for Ol Onal is U+1E5D0–U+1E5FF:

Ol Onal^{[1]}^{[2]} Official Unicode Consortium code chart (PDF)
	0	1	2	3	4	5	6	7	8	9	A	B	C	D	E	F
U+1E5Dx	𞗐	𞗑	𞗒	𞗓	𞗔	𞗕	𞗖	𞗗	𞗘	𞗙	𞗚	𞗛	𞗜	𞗝	𞗞	𞗟
U+1E5Ex	𞗠	𞗡	𞗢	𞗣	𞗤	𞗥	𞗦	𞗧	𞗨	𞗩	𞗪	𞗫	𞗬	𞗭	𞗮	𞗯
U+1E5Fx	𞗰	𞗱	𞗲	𞗳	𞗴	𞗵	𞗶	𞗷	𞗸	𞗹	𞗺					𞗿
Notes 1.As of Unicode version 17.0 2.Grey areas indicate non-assigned code points

== See also ==
- Bhumij
- Bhumij language
