= Input and output (medicine) =

In biology, Input and output (I&O) is the measure of food and fluids that enter and exit the body. Certain patients with the need are placed on I & O, and if so, their urinary output is measured.

With self-toileting patients on I & O, or those who are assisted to a regular toilet or portable commode, a receptacle is placed in the toilet bowl that catches all urine that is put out by the patient. This, in turn, is measured by the nursing staff and recorded prior to its disposal.

If the patient is using a bedpan, the nursing staff member who empties the bedpan measures the urine prior to its disposal.

Urinals usually contain measuring lines providing easy measurement. Urinals are also useful for measuring urine from other sources.

Catheters, which are frequently used when it is necessary to measure a patient's output, often have measuring lines on their bags, but these are not considered to be accurate because the bag is floppy. Urine that is emptied from a catheter must be placed in a level container (such as a urinal) in order to be measured.
