= 0I =

0I (zero I) or 0-I may refer to:

- An iron (golf) numbered zero (abbreviation "0i")
- Zero inflation (abbreviation "0i")
- Zero initial in syllable onset (abbreviation "0i")
- Zero ideal (abbreviation "0i"); see list of zero terms

== See also ==
- I0 (disambiguation)
- Oi (disambiguation)
