= Corilagin =

- Chemical structure of corilagin

Names
- IUPAC name [3,5-dihydroxy-2-(3,4,5-trihydroxybenzoyl)oxy-6-[(3,4,5-trihydroxybenzoyl)oxymethyl]oxan-4-yl] 3,4,5-trihydroxybenzoate
- Other names beta-1-O-galloyl-3,6-(R)-hexahydroxydiphenoyl-d-glucose

Identifiers
CAS Number	23094-69-1
3D model (JSmol)	Interactive image; Interactive image
ChEMBL	ChEMBL449392
ChemSpider	4265734
PubChem CID	73568
UNII	62LOS9TW6D
CompTox Dashboard (EPA)	DTXSID301104707 DTXSID90865084, DTXSID301104707
- InChI: InChI=1S/C27H22O18/c28-9-1-6(2-10(29)16(9)32)24(39)45-27-22(38)23-19(35)13(43-27)5-42-25(40)7-3-11(30)17(33)20(36)14(7)15-8(26(41)44-23)4-12(31)18(34)21(15)37/h1-4,13,19,22-23,27-38H,5H2/t13-,19-,22-,23+,27+/m1/s1 Key: TUSDEZXZIZRFGC-XIGLUPEJSA-N; InChI=1/C27H24O18/c28-11-1-8(2-12(29)18(11)34)24(39)42-7-17-21(37)23(44-25(40)9-3-13(30)19(35)14(31)4-9)22(38)27(43-17)45-26(41)10-5-15(32)20(36)16(33)6-10/h1-6,17,21-23,27-38H,7H2/t17-,21-,22-,23+,27+/m1/s1 Key: RNKMOGIPOMVCHO-SJMVAQJGBQ
- SMILES: O[C@@H]1[C@H]2COC(=O)c3cc(O)c(O)c(O)c3c4c(O)c(O)c(O)cc4C(=O)O[C@@H]1[C@@H](O)[C@H](OC(=O)c5cc(O)c(O)c(O)c5)O2; c1c(cc(c(c1O)O)O)C(=O)OC[C@@H]2[C@H]([C@@H]([C@H]([C@@H](O2)OC(=O)c3cc(c(c(c3)O)O)O)O)OC(=O)c4cc(c(c(c4)O)O)O)O

Properties
Chemical formula	C_{27}H_{22}O_{18}
Molar mass	634.45 g/mol
- Except where otherwise noted, data are given for materials in their standard state (at 25 °C [77 °F], 100 kPa). verify (what is ?) Infobox references

Corilagin is an ellagitannin. Corilagin was first isolated in 1951 from Dividivi extract and from Caesalpinia coriaria, hence the name of the molecule. It can also be found in Alchornea glandulosa and in the leaves of Punica granatum (pomegranate).

It is a weak carbonic anhydrase inhibitor.

Ellagic acid and corilagin inhibit TGF-β1–dependent EMT and has been shown to attenuate fibrogenesis in a mouse model. Fibrosis is also indicated in many health conditions, including skin aging and MRSA susceptibility.
