= O1 =

O1 or O-1 may refer to:

== Aircraft ==
- Cessna O-1 Bird Dog, an observation aircraft manufactured by Cessna
- O-1 Curtiss Falcon, an observation aircraft manufactured by the Curtiss Aircraft Company
- O-1 Airship, an Italian manufactured semi-rigid airship operated by the US Navy

== Music ==
- O1 (album), by Hiroyuki Sawano, 2015
- O1, a 2000 album by Son of Dave

== Military ==
- O-1 or fenrik, a second lieutenant rank in Norway
- The pay grade for ensign and second lieutenant ranks in the U.S. uniformed services
- USS O-1 (SS-62), lead ship of the United States O class submarines
- HNLMS O 1, a 1905 Royal Netherlands Navy O class submarine

== Science and technology ==
- O_{1}, or atomic oxygen
- O1 type star, a subclass of O-type star
- O-1 tool steel, a type of oil-hardening tool steel
- Haplogroup O1 (Y-DNA), a Y-DNA haplogroup
- O1: an EEG electrode site according to the 10–20 system
- O(1), time complexity expressed using Big O notation
- OpenAI o1, AI model released by OpenAI

== Other ==
- O-1 visa, a variety of the U.S. O visa, allowing for temporary immigration for work purposes for individuals of extraordinary ability or achievement in certain areas
- Otoyol 1, a motorway in Turkey
- Ö1, an Austrian radio station
- O1 Communications, Inc., a California telecommunications company
- Orchestra ONE (O1), an experimental youth orchestra based in Maidstone, United Kingdom
- GNR Class O1, a class of British 2-8-0 steam locomotive designed by Nigel Gresley (later redesignated Class O3)
- LNER Thompson Class O1, a class of British 2-8-0 steam locomotive designed by Edward Thompson and rebuilt from Class O4

== See also ==
- 01 (disambiguation)
- 1O (disambiguation)
