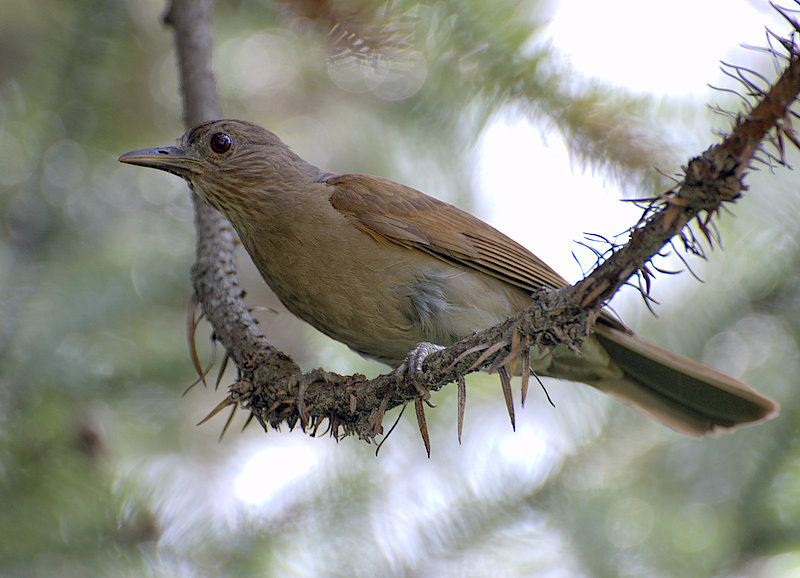
- Adult in São Paulo, Brazil

Conservation status
- Least Concern (IUCN 3.1)

Scientific classification
- Kingdom: Animalia
- Phylum: Chordata
- Class: Aves
- Order: Passeriformes
- Family: Turdidae
- Genus: Turdus
- Species: T. leucomelas

Binomial name
- Turdus leucomelas Vieillot, 1818

= Pale-breasted thrush =

Species of bird

The pale-breasted thrush (Turdus leucomelas) is a species of bird in the family Turdidae. It is found in every mainland South American country except Chile and Ecuador.

== Taxonomy and systematics ==
The pale-breasted thrush was originally described in 1818 with the binomial Turdus leucomelas and has retained it ever since. However, taxonomic systems differ in their assignment of subspecies.

The IOC, the Clements taxonomy, and AviList assign it these four subspecies:

- T. l. albiventer Spix, 1824
- T. l. cautor Wetmore, 1946
- T. l. upichiarum Stiles & Avendaño, 2019
- T. l. leucomelas Vieillot, 1818

However, BirdLife International's Handbook of the Birds of the World does not recognize T. l. upichiarum.

This article follows the IOC et al. four-subspecies model.

== Description ==
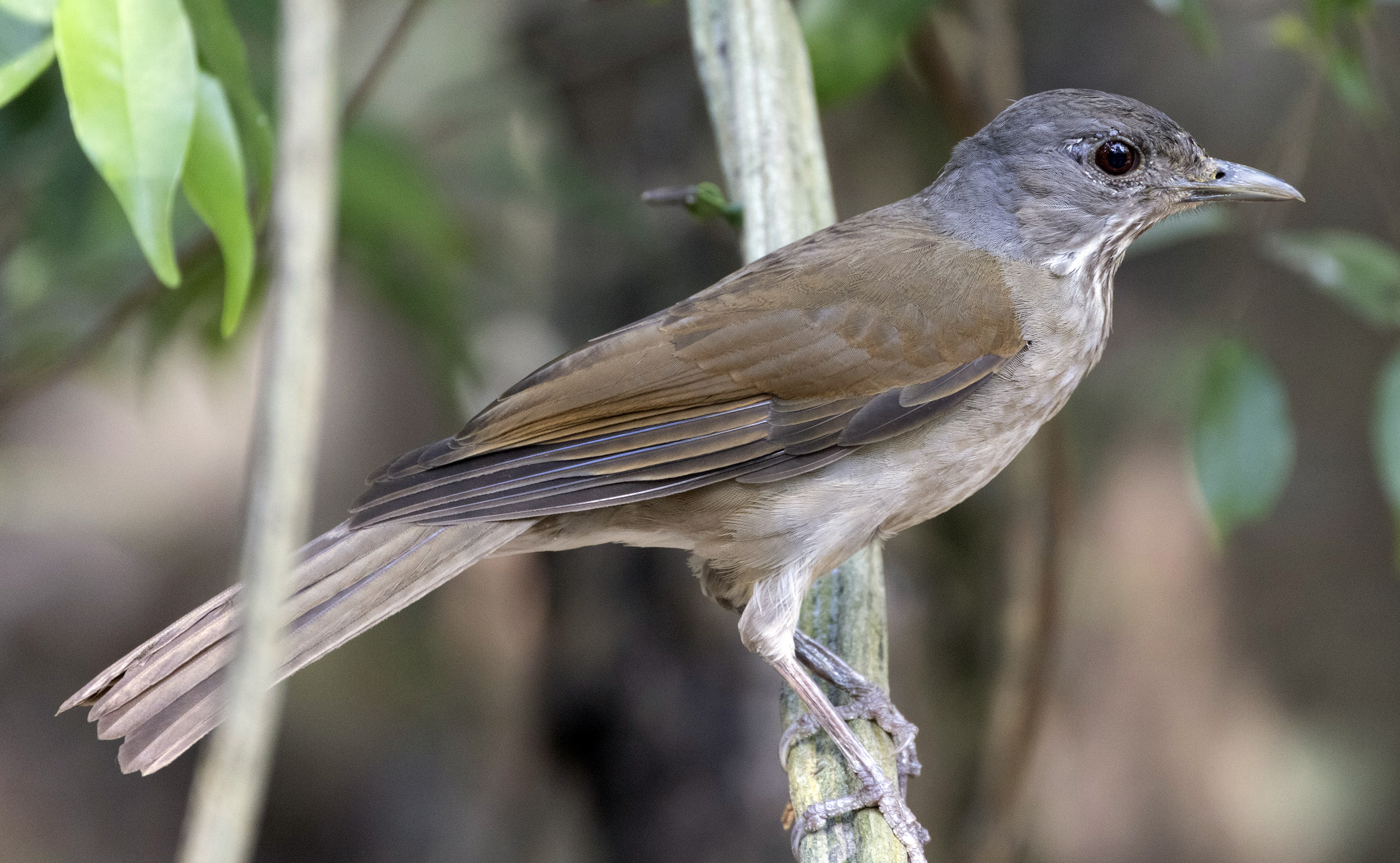
NE Brazil

The pale-breasted thrush is 23 to 27 cm (9.1 to 11 in) long and weighs 47 to 78 g (1.7 to 2.8 oz). The sexes have essentially the same plumage, though females sometimes have darker heads than males. Adults of the nominate subspecies T. l. leucomelas have a medium gray crown and whitish-streaked grayish ear coverts. Their upperparts, wings, and tail are generally pale olive brown. Their wing coverts and the edges of their secondaries are slightly rustier and their primaries and tail are somewhat darker. Their throat is whitish with thin brown streaks, their breast and flanks pale grayish buff, and their belly to vent whitish. Juveniles resemble adults with the addition of buff streaks and spots on their upperparts and brownish mottling on their underparts.

All subspecies have a dark iris, a greenish yellow bill, and light brown legs and feet. The other subspecies differ from the nominate and each other thus:

- T. l. albiventer: smaller than nominate with a more ashy-gray head, back, and rump and less rust in the wing
- T. l. cautor: brown back and wings intermediate between nominate and albiventer
- T. l. upichiarum: similar to albiventer but smaller and darker, more uniform head-to-rump color, and darker gray underparts

== Distribution and habitat ==
The subspecies of the pale-breasted thrush are found thus:

- T. l. albiventer: northern (except Guajira Peninsula) and northeastern Colombia; from eastern Colombia across most of the northern half of Venezuela; southeastern Venezuela; and east across the Guianas and northern Brazil including along the lower Amazon River
- T. l. cautor: extreme northern Colombia's Guajira Peninsula
- T. l. upichiarum: southeastern Colombia
- T. l. leucomelas: extreme southeastern Peru east through central and eastern Bolivia into Brazil; Brazil south of a line roughly from southern Rondônia northeast to northern Maranhão; eastern Paraguay, northeastern Argentina, and northeastern Uruguay; separately in extreme northern Peru

The pale-breasted thrush inhabits a wide variety of landscapes, most of which are somewhat open. They include the edges and openings of extensive forest, the interior of more open forest and woodland, secondary forest, savanna, gallery forest, palm groves, plantations such as those of shade coffee, other cultivated areas, parks, gardens, and yards. To be attractive the last four require enough shrubs to provide shade. In elevation in Colombia it ranges up to 1,800 m (5,900 ft), in Venezuela north of the Orinoco River to 2,000 m (6,600 ft) and to 1,900 m (6,200 ft) south of it, and in Brazil mostly to 1,500 m (4,900 ft) and locally higher. The isolated northern Peruvian population is found between 800 and 1,400 m (2,600 and 4,600 ft).

== Behavior ==
=== Movement ===
The pale-breasted thrush is a sedentary year-round resident.

=== Feeding ===
The pale-breasted thrush feeds mostly on fruits but includes much smaller amounts of insects, worms, and small lizards in its diet. It feeds on both wild and cultivated fruits. It takes fruit in trees and also feeds on fallen fruit on the ground.

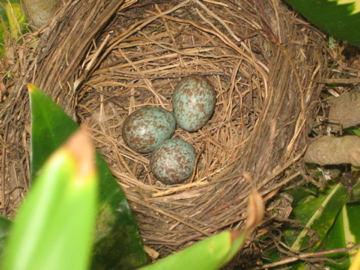
A nest with eggs in a residential garden in Domburg, Suriname

=== Breeding ===
The pale-breasted thrush's breeding season has not been fully defined and varies geographically. It spans January to August in Colombia. It is thought to breed year-round in Suriname and almost year-round in Venezuela. In French Guiana its season includes February, July, and December. In southern Brazil it apparently spans at least October to May. The species' nest is a bulky cup made from moss and rootlets held together with mud. It can be placed in a tree, shrub, or human-made substrates such as rafters, window ledges, and air conditioners. The clutch is usually three eggs though two and four are common; they are bluish green with reddish brown spots. The incubation period is 12 to 13 days and fledging occurs 16 to 17 days after hatch. In some areas the shiny cowbird (Molothrus bonariensis) is a brood parisite.

=== Vocalization ===
The pale-breasted thrush sings in a tree from its mid-section to crown and sometimes in flight. Its song is "a series of melodious phrases with individual notes variably repeated, chirr juep juele chip chirr". It has been compared to that of an American robin (T. migratorius) but is more complex. Its call is "distinctively guttural, rattly wooden" and has been written as quwaak quwaak quwaak, wert-wert-wert, and reep reep reep. Its alarm call is "a rough jig-jig or zit-zit-zit".

== Status ==
The IUCN has assessed the pale-breasted thrush as being of Least Concern. It has a very large range; its population size is not known but is believed to be stable. No immediate threats have been identified. The species is considered "locally fairly common" in Colombia, "common and widespread" in Venezuela, "uncommon and geographically restricted" in Peru, and "common to frequent" in Brazil. It is common in the lowlands of Suriname and French Guiana. "At least in parts of [its] range, [it] benefits from human activity, frequently using buildings for nesting."
