= Io (English band) =

English experimental rock band from Birmingham

io
- Origin: Birmingham, England, UK
- Genres: Experimental rock
- Years active: 2006 -
- Members: Al Lawson; Stu Atkins; Dave Wright; Steve Wood
- Past members: Tom Lawson, James Black
- Website: http://www.weareio.co.uk

io is an English experimental rock band from Birmingham, England. The band currently consists of Al Lawson (guitar/vocals), Stu Atkins (guitar), Dave Wright (drums), and Steve Wood (bass).

The band formed in 2006 after the collapse of two Birmingham bands, State of Serenity and Project-7. Al Lawson (guitars/vocals), Stu Atkins (guitar), Dave Wright (drums), and Tom Lawson (bass) started writing loud, progressive, instrumental music that evoked the feeling of Mogwai, ISIS and Red Sparowes. After cementing a live show described as "so spectacular and powerful it could have soundtracked the moon's conversion from a glowing, white golf ball into a fearsome, reddish planet", the band entered the studio to record their debut EP, itwaslostinthefirewestarted. Recorded by Jay at Dub:Rek studios in Derby, the self-released EP garnered praise such as "a 'choose your own adventure' book for audiophiles" and "sublime, contemplative, and explosive epic noise". In August 2007, the band tour the EP in the UK with friends Death of London and To the Bones.

The band's debut album Monolith released in Europe in March 2008. Released by short lived French label Arghh! Records (Mothertrucker, God is an Astronaut, The Mantra Above the Spotless Melt Moon) the album consisted of the four tracks from itwaslostinthefirewestarted together with two new tracks, "Where We're Going we Don't Need Roads" and "Farewell, My Concubine". Favourable reviews in France, Germany and Italy allowed io to tour mainland Europe to support the release. After the tour, James Black, who had been playing bass since the recording of the debut EP, left to band to pursue dubstep.

A struggle to replace Black saw a quiet end to 2008. In 2009, Steve Wood took over on bass and the band began playing live and writing for their second album. Materioptikon was released in November on Grammatical Records. The album received positive reviews such as "A beautiful, melodic, Post-Rock epic that forces repeated listens".

== Discography ==
Title	Release date	Label	Type
itwaslostinthefirewestarted	2007	Self-Released	EP
Monolith	2008	Arghh! Records	LP
Materioptikon	2010	Grammatical Records	LP
Our Disintegrating Museum	2013	????	LP
