= 01 =

== Common meanings ==
- The year 2001, or any year ending with 01
- The month of January
- 1 (number)

== Arts and media ==
=== Music ===
- '01 (Richard Müller album), 2001
- 01 (Urban Zakapa album), 2011
- 01011001, the seventh studio album from Arjen Anthony Lucassen's Ayreon project

=== Other media ===
- The codename given to the Wing Gundam by Oz in the anime Gundam Wing
- Kamen Rider Zero-One, a Japanese tokusatsu drama series produced by Toei Company and TV Asahi
- Zero One also known as Machine City, a city-state from the Matrix series
- Pro Wrestling ZERO1-MAX, a wrestling promotion formerly known as Pro Wrestling ZERO-ONE

== Vehicles ==
- Lynk & Co 01, a compact SUV built since 2017
- Nammi 01, an electric subcompact hatchback
- Ji Yue 01, an electric crossover SUV
- BAR 01, a Formula One car

== Other uses ==
- 01 (telephone number), UK internal dialing code for London between the late 1950s and 1990
- 01.org, website for open source Intel projects
- Kolmogorov's zero-one law, a law of probability theory
- Ain, a French department

== See also ==
- One (disambiguation)
- O1 (disambiguation)
- Zero1 (disambiguation)
- Zero one (disambiguation)
