= Io (island) =

Greek island in the Libyan Sea

Native name: Ίο
- Interactive map of Io

Geography
- Coordinates: 34°56′56″N 26°07′39″E
- Archipelago: Cretan Islands

Administration
- Greece
- Region: Crete
- Regional unit: Lasithi

Demographics
- Population: 0 (2001)

Io (Greek: Ίο), is an uninhabited Greek islet, close to the coast of Lasithi, eastern Crete, and in the Libyan Sea. It is part of the Lefki municipality.

== See also ==
- List of islands of Greece
