= Iozen =

Mountain in Toyama, Japan

Coordinates: 36°30′46″N 136°47′46″E

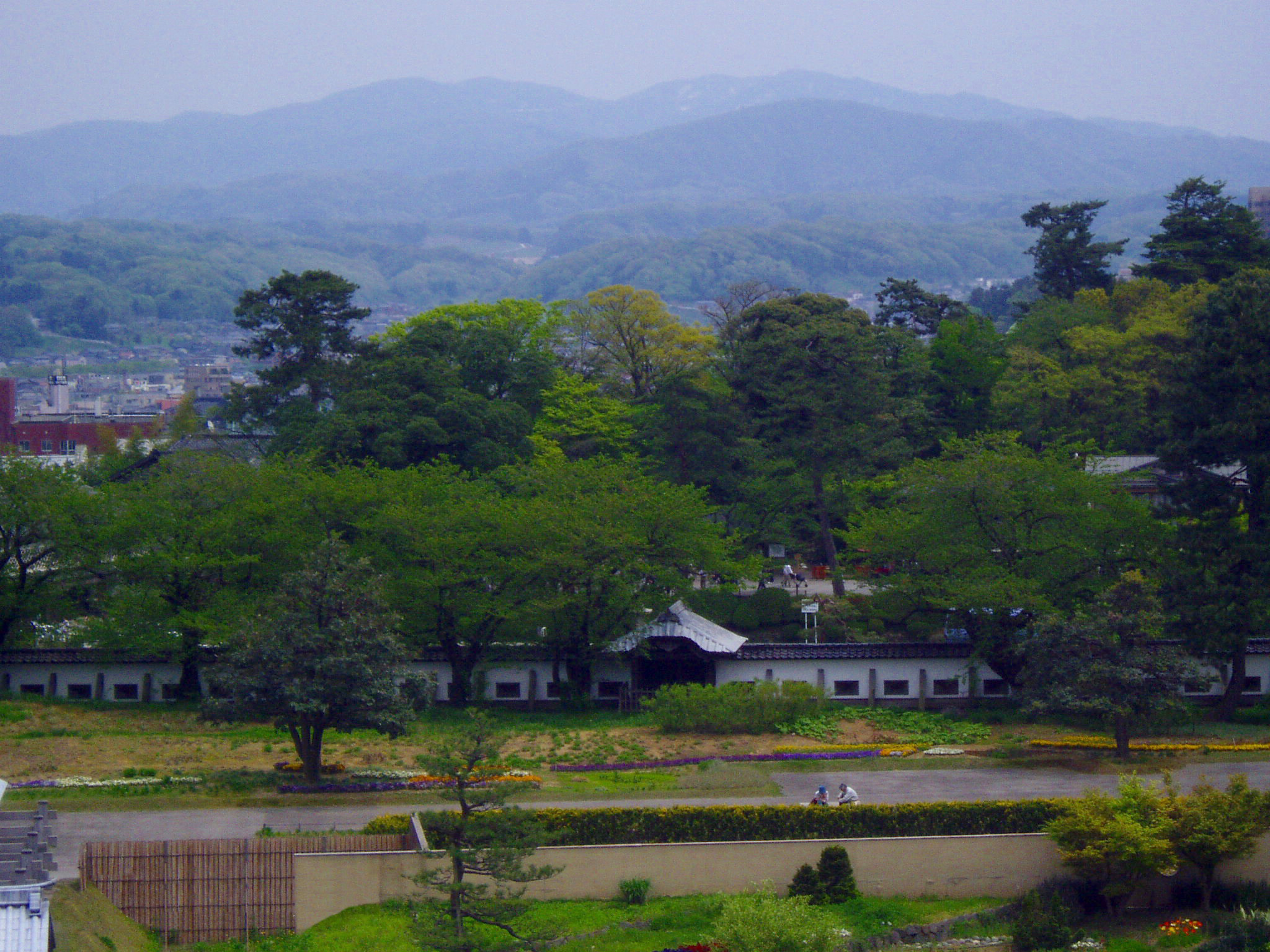
View of Mt Iwozen from Kanazawa Castle

Mount Iō (医王山, Iō-zen), also Iozen, is a 939-metre (3,081 ft) tall mountain in Japan, on the border of Kanazawa City, Ishikawa and Nanto City, Toyama.

In ancient times, the Shugendō religion flourished in this area, and Sozen-ji Temple still retains items associated with Taichō (shugendō monk).

Currently, There is a IOX-AROSA Ski Resort on the east side of the mountain.
