= Level 0 =

Level 0 may refer to:

- Level 0, the lowest level of automation in a self-driving automobile
- Level 0 Modules, genetic elements in Golden Gate Cloning
- Level 0 coronavirus restrictions, see COVID-19 pandemic in Scotland#Levels System
- Level 0, the starting level of The Backrooms
- The ground floor of a building, denoted in some numbering schemes as Level 0
