= 1º de Mayo =

1° de Mayo (May 1st) may refer to:

- 1º de Mayo (Seville Metro), in Seville, Spain
- 1° de Mayo (Mexibús, Line 1), in Ecatepec de Morelos, Mexico
- 1° de Mayo (Mexibús, Line 2), in Ecatepec de Morelos, Mexico

== See also ==
- 1º de Maio, a football club in São Tomé and Príncipe
- Estrela Clube Primeiro de Maio, a football club in Angola
