= Primero de Mayo, Entre Ríos =

Primero de Mayo
- Municipality and village
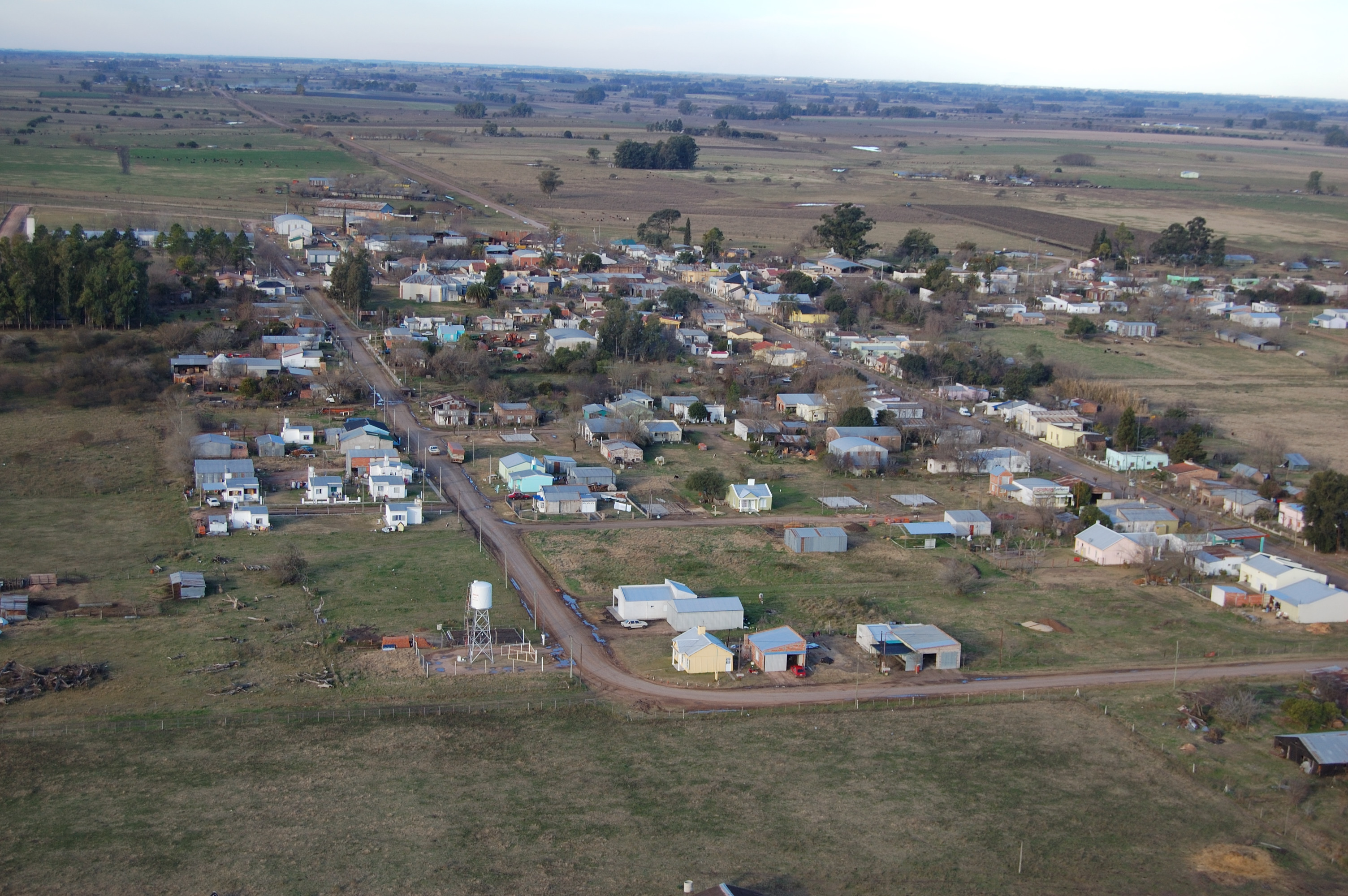

- Location in Argentina
- Coordinates: 32°15′26″S 58°25′22″W
- Country: Argentina
- Province: Entre Ríos Province
- Time zone: UTC−3 (ART)

Primero de Mayo is a village and municipality in Entre Ríos Province in north-eastern Argentina.
