= First officer =

First officer may refer to:

== Transportation ==
- Chief mate, the second-in-command (usually) of a merchant ship
- First officer (aviation) or "co-pilot", the second-in-command of a civil aircraft

== Military ==
- Executive officer (military), the second-in-command of a naval vessel
- First officer, the most senior civil service position in the United States Foreign Service
- First officer, a rank in the Air Transport Auxiliary corresponding to flight lieutenant in the Royal Air Force
- First officer, a rank in the Women's Royal Naval Service corresponding to lieutenant-commander in the Royal Navy
