= List of LGBTQ bookstores =

LGBTQIA+ Bookstores

The following list article contains the names and locations of LGBTQ+ bookstores, sorted by location. The bookstores listed are brick and mortar stores with a focus on the LGBT community and LGBTQ literature.

== Open bookstores ==
=== Asia ===
Country	City	Name	Opening Year	Image
Taiwan	Taipei	GinGin	1999	
Taiwan	Taipei	Fembooks (女書店)	1994	

=== America ===
Country	City	Name	Opening year	Image
Canada	Toronto	Glad Day Bookshop	1970	
Canada	Vancouver	Spartacus Books	1973	
Canada	Vancouver	Little Sister's Book and Art Emporium	1983	
Costa Rica	San José	Nuestras Letras	2010	
United States	New York, New York	Bureau of General Services—Queer Division (BGSQD)	2012	
United States	New York, New York	Yu & Me Books	2021	Yu & Me Books Storefront
United States	New York, New York	The Nonbinarian Bookstore	2024	
United States	New York, New York	Hive Mind Books	2025	
United States	New York, New York	Gladys Books & Wine	2025	
United States	Tucson, Arizona	Antigone Books	1973	
United States	Philadelphia, Pennsylvania	Giovanni's Room Bookstore	1973	
United States	Decatur, Georgia	Charis Books & More	1974	
United States	Marietta, Georgia	The Lavender Bookshop	2024	
United States	Madison, Wisconsin	A Room of One's Own	1975	
United States	Austin, Texas	Book Woman	1977	
United States	Austin, Texas	The Little Gay Shop	2019	
United States	New Orleans, Louisiana	Frenchmen Art and Books; Previously Faubourg Marigny Art and Books	1978	
United States	Chicago, Illinois	Women & Children First	1979	
United States	Chicago, Illinois	Unabridged Bookstore	1980	
United States	San Francisco, California	Fabulosa Books; Dog Eared Books until 2021	1992	
United States	Seattle, Washington	Charlie's Queer Books	2023	
United States	Asheville, North Carolina	Firestorm Books & Coffee	2008	
United States	Salt Lake City, Utah	Under the Umbrella Bookstore	2021	
United States	Washington, D.C.	Little District Books	2022	
United States	Tallahassee, Florida	Common Ground Books	2023	
Mexico	Mexico City	El Armario Abierto	1998	
Mexico	Mexico City	Somos voces Voces en Tinta until 2012	2005	

=== Europe ===
Country	City	Name	Opening Year	Image
Germany	Mannheim; Cologne	Der Andere Buchladen	1978	
Germany	Berlin	Prinz Eisenherz	1978	
Germany	Stuttgart	Erlkönig	1983	
Austria	Vienna	Berg und Löwenherz	1993	
Spain	Madrid	Berkana	1993	
Spain	Madrid	A Different Life		
Spain	Madrid	Mary Read	2020	
Spain	Madrid	Plastic Books	2024	
Spain	Barcelona	Antinous	1997	
Spain	Barcelona	La Raposa	2017	
Spain	Barcelona	Acció Perifèrica	2022	
France	Paris	Les Mots à la Bouche	1980	
France	Paris	Violette and Co	2004	
France	Nice	Librairie Vigna	2011	
England	London	Gay's the Word	1979	
England	London	The Common Press	2021	
England	York	The Portal Bookshop	2019	
England	Birmingham	Proud Geek	2020	
England	Leeds	The Bookish Type	2020	
England	Manchester	Queer Lit	2021	
England	Manchester	Gay Pride Shop	2014	
England	Darlington	The Queerish Bookshop	2023	
England	Durham	Bookwyrm	2022	
Scotland	Edinburgh	Lavender Menace Bookshop; Now also an archive	1982	
Scotland	Edinburgh	Lighthouse	2017	
Scotland	Glasgow	Category Is Books	2018	
Wales	Aberystwyth	Gayberystwyth Books	2023	
Wales	Cardiff	Shelf Life	2019	
Wales	Cardiff	Paned o Gê	2020	
Wales	Hay-On-Wye	Gay on Wye	2023	
Italy	Milan; Rome	Antigone Books	2016	
Netherlands	Utrecht	Boekwinkel Savannah Bay	1975	
Portugal	Porto	Livraria aberta	2021	
Sweden	Malmö	PAGE 28	2020	
Switzerland	Basel	Arcados	1974	
Switzerland	Bern	Queerbooks	2013	
Poland	Poznań	Księgarnia Stonewall	2015	

=== Oceania ===
Country	City	Name	Opening year	Image
Australia	Sydney	Sappho Books		
Australia	Melbourne	Hares & Hyenas	1991	

== Closed bookstores ==
=== Asia ===
Country	City	Name	Years	Image

=== America ===
Country	City	Name	Years	Image
Argentina	Buenos Aires	Otras Letras	2009 to 2013	
Canada	Montreal	Librairie L'Androgyne	1973 to 2002	
Canada	Ottawa	After Stonewall; Now also an art gallery	1990 to ¿?	
United States	Austin, Texas	Liberty Books	1986 to 1996	
United States	Ellis Island, New York	Adonis Books	1967 to ¿?	
United States	New Orleans, Louisiana	Beckham's Bookshop; No longer focusing on LGBT+ books	1967 to ¿?	
United States	New York, New York	Oscar Wilde Bookshop	1967 to 2009	
United States	New York, New York	Bluestockings Bookstore	1999-2025	Two people smile and give a thumbs up in front of a bookstore with a large sign that says Bluestockings, books, cafe, activist center in white
United States	Minneapolis, Minnesota	Amazon Bookstore Cooperative	1970 to 2012	
United States	Minneapolis, Minnesota	A Brother's Touch Bookshop	1983 to 2014	
United States	Dallas, Texas; Austin, Texas; Houston, Texas	Lobo Bookshop	1973 to 1988; 1986 to 2004	
United States	Washington D. C. Baltimore, Maryland; Rehoboth Beach, Delaware; Norfolk, Virginia	Lambda Rising	1974 to 2008; 1984 to 2008; 1991 to 2010; 1996 to 2007	
United States	San Francisco, California	Paperback Traffic	1972 to 1982	
United States	San Francisco, California	Old Wives Tales	1976 to 1995	
United States	San Francisco, California	Walt Whitman Bookshop	1978 to 1980	
United States	San Francisco, California	Noe Books and News	1980s a ¿?	
United States	San Francisco, California	Love That Dares	1987 to 1988	
United States	Los Angeles, California; San Francisco, California; New York, New York	A Different Light	1979 to 2009; 1985 to 2001; 1983 to 2011	
United States	Bloomington, Indiana	Dreams and Swords; Previously Aquarius Books	1986 to 1988	
United States	Houston, Texas	Wilde 'N' Stein	1977 to 1986	
United States	Houston, Texas	Inklings Bookshop	1988 to 1997	
United States	Houston, Texas	Crossroads Market	1992 to 2002	
United States	San Diego, California	Obelisk Shoppe	1992 to 2011	
United States	Milwaukee, Wisconsin	Outwords Books, Gifts & Coffee; Previously Afterwords Bookstore and Espresso Bar	1993 to 2023	
United States	Atlanta, Georgia	Outwrite	1994 to 2012	
United States	Nashville, Tennessee	Outloud	1995 to 2010	
United States	Boston, Massachusetts	Calamus	2000 to 2016	
West Hollywood, California	Circus of Books			

=== Europe ===
Country	City	Name	Years	Image
Germany	Hamburg	Männerschwarm	1981 to 2015	
Germany	Frankfurt	Oscar Wilde	1994 to ¿?	
Scotland	Edinburgh	First of May Bookshop	1977 to 1990	
Spain	Barcelona	Cómplices	1994 to 2022	
Spain	Bilbao	Safo de Lesbos	2005 to ¿?	
Spain	Seville	Librería Mira		
Spain	Valencia	El Cobertizo	1997 to 2004	
France	Paris	Blue Book	2003 to 2008	
France	Lyon	Etat d'Esprit	¿? to 2009	
France	Marsella	Les Mots pour le dire	¿? to 2008	
Italy	Milan	La Babele	1987 to 2012	
Italy	Rome	La Babele	1993 to 2009	
Netherlands	Nijmegen	De Feeks	1977 to 2022	
Netherlands	Amsterdam	Intermale	1984 to 2011	
Netherlands	Amsterdam	Vrolijk; Now online	1984 to ¿?	
Portugal	Lisbon	Esquina Cor de Rosa	1999 to 2006	
Sweden	Stockholm	Rosa Rummet	1981 to 2001	

=== Oceania ===
Country	City	Name	Years	Image
Australia	Sydney	The Bookshop Darlinghurst	1982 - 2025	
