= LGBTQ bookstores =

Bookstores catering to LGBTQ authors and themes

LGBTQ bookstores include bookstores specialising in books written by gay, lesbian, bisexual, trans or queer authors, or exploring LGBTQ themes. Some bookstores focus on specifically gay or lesbian literature, or genres including fiction, non fiction, pornography, or comic books.

== History of LGBTQ bookstores ==
Across the world, LGBTQ literature has faced overt censorship from governments, or mainstream stores have not stocked books by queer authors or about queer lives, limiting access to queer books. LGBTQ bookstores have arisen out of necessity, protest, or to celebrate LGBTQ literature and create a safe space for queer readers.

During the 1960s, printing became cheaper and less institutionally controlled due to the proliferation of photocopiers. Traditional publishers did not support LGBTQ publishing, but self-publishing and small presses allowed LGBTQ people to create literature on their own. These works were distributed by mail, word-of-mouth, and underground venues, until LGBTQ bookstores provided a platform for them. LGBTQ bookstores became more common during the 1970s along with feminist bookstores. By the 1980s, queer bookstores were present in multiple countries, including in over 20 North American cities.

=== Mail order LGBTQ bookstores ===
David K Johnson argues that LGBTQ literature was key to queer identity formation in the 20th century, which Katelyn Spencer has found is still true in the 21st century. Johnson notes that, to circumvent mainstream publishers, "gay men and lesbians developed their own ways of selling and distributing [books], first through mail-order book services and later through brick-and-mortar bookstores".

=== Censorship of mainstream bookstores ===
Mainstream bookstores have been subject to legal procedures or criminal damage because of displays of LGBTQ literature.

In July 2023, Lira, the Hungarian bookstore chain, was fined for selling unwrapped copies of the graphic novel Heartstopper, in contravention of laws against 'promotion' of homosexuality introduced by Viktor Orban's far-right government in 2021.

In June 2024, the Le Failler bookstore in France was vandalised for its display of rainbow flags at the entrance.

== Notable LGBTQ bookstores by country ==
=== Australia ===
The Bookshop was founded in 1982 by Les McDonald and Wayne Harrison in Sydney, two years before New South Wales decriminalised sex between men. The store closed in 2025.

=== Canada ===
Glad Day Bookshop opened in Toronto, Ontario in 1970. The shop has moved physical locations multiple times, including the most recent relocation to the Queen West neighbourhood in 2025.

Librairie L'Androgyne opened in Montreal in 1973 and closed in 2002.

=== France ===
Violette and Co, a store and cafe specialising in lesbian and feminist writing opened in Paris in 2004. It closed in 2022, but was reopened in 2024 following a crowdfunding campaign.

=== India ===
In 2010, Shobna Kumar founded Queer Ink, India's first queer bookstore. It began as an online bookseller, stocking titles in a variety of languages.

=== United States of America ===
Oscar Wilde Memorial Bookshop opened in New York in 1967 founded by Craig Rodwell, one mile away from the Stonewall Inn.

Gladys Books and Wine opened in September 2025 in Brooklyn, New York, as a specialist store for lesbian and feminist writing, with a focus on black lesbian stories and community.

=== United Kingdom ===
Gay's the Word, the first gay bookshop in England, opened in London in 1979. It was raided by police in 1984, under Section 28 anti-homosexuality laws brought in by Margaret Thatcher's Conservative government.

Lavender Menace was the first lesbian and gay bookshop in Scotland, opened in 1982 as a bricks and mortar store by Sigrid Nielsen and Bob Orr. The predecessor market stall, Open Gaze, had first opened in 1976 as an initiative of the Scottish Homosexual Rights Group’s Gay Information Centre.

=== Taiwan ===
Fembooks was the first feminist bookstore in the Chinese-speaking world, with its range including books on sexuality and gender.
