= First of May Bookshop =

Bookstore in Edinburgh, Scotland

Coordinates: 55.9477°N 3.1926°W

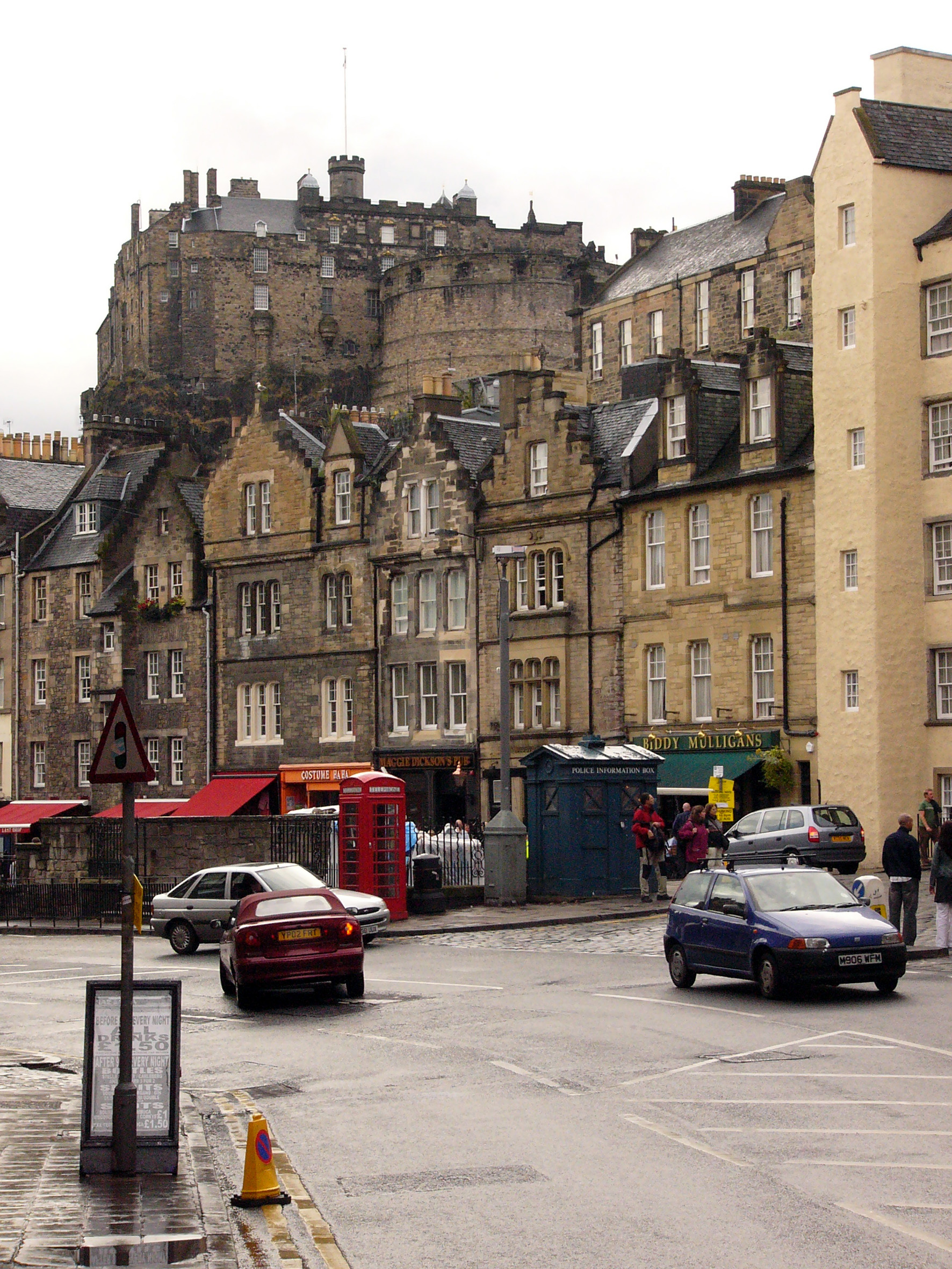
Location of the First of May Bookshop: Grassmarket, Edinburgh

The First of May Bookshop in Edinburgh opened in 1977 and operated until 1990. It sold LGBTQ and feminist texts and was considered to be politically left-leaning. The bookshop preceded Lavender Menace, the first gay bookshop in Scotland.

== History ==
The First of May Bookshop opened in 1977, at a time when homosexuality was still illegal in Scotland. Homosexuality was not legalised until 1980.

When The First of May Bookshop first opened in 1977, it was located on Niddry Street. In 1980, it moved to 43 Candlemaker Row in the Grassmarket. This second location helped to increase sales.

Initially, twelve people ran the bookshop as volunteers. Later, a government scheme meant that the volunteers could be paid. After moving to Candlemaker Row, there was a total of three paid employees who worked alongside up to ten volunteers.

== Legacy ==
Bob Orr worked at the First of May Bookshop before co-owning Lavender Menance Bookshop in Edinburgh alongside Sigrid Nielsen in 1982. Lavender Menance was the first LGBT bookshop in Scotland and the second in the United Kingdom. It was open from 1982 - 1986.

== See also ==
- List of LGBT bookstores
