= James Ley =

James Ley may refer to:

- James Ley, 1st Earl of Marlborough (1552–1629), Lord Chief Justice of the King's Bench in Ireland and then in England; English MP and Lord High Treasurer
- James Ley, 3rd Earl of Marlborough (1618–1665), British peer
- James Ley (dramatist), Scottish playwright and screenwriter
- James Ley (literary critic) (born 1971), Australian literary critic and essayist
- James Clement Ley (1869–1946), Royal Navy officer
