= Category Is Books =

LGBT bookshop in Glasgow

Coordinates: 55.8369°N 4.2683°W

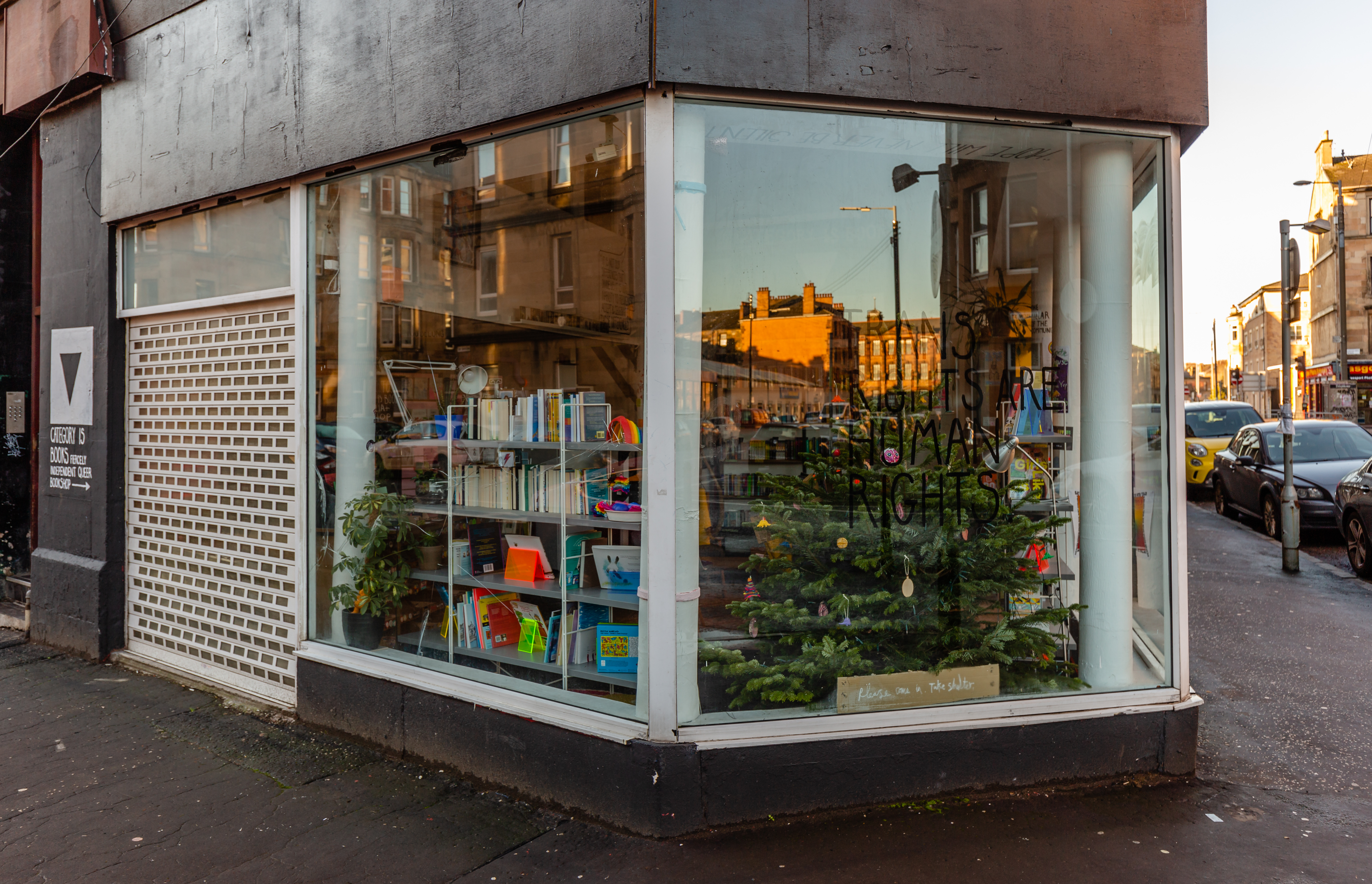
- Category Is Books, December 2018
- Founded: September 2018
- Website: https://www.categoryisbooks.com/

Category Is Books is an independent bookshop in Glasgow, Scotland. It is one of only two LGBT+ bookshop in Scotland and one of only eight in the United Kingdom. It was established by Bug and Fionn Duffy-Scott in September 2018.

Every book stocked at the store is either written by someone from the LGBT+ community, contains at least one LGBT+ character or has an LGBT+ narrative.

== History ==
Category Is Books was launched with help from Gay's The Word, the first and only remaining LGBT+ bookshop in London.

The shop hosted many queer community events and a non-drinking space for the LGBT+ community. They host events such as yoga, queer tarot readings, and a transgender-friendly pop-up barbershop.

Community is an integral part of how the bookshop runs, with co-owner Duffy-Scott saying, "Community is important here and it’s a specifically queer space so a lot of the events have nothing to do with books."

The bookshop was visited by Nicola Sturgeon in November 2018.

The shop closed due to COVID-19 but offered deliveries by skateboard and bike.

Category Is Books has reopened following the COVID-19 lockdowns of 2020–2021.

In September 2026, the bookshop was vandalised: a window with the word "trans" on it was smashed. More than £14,000 was fundraised to support repairs and the purchase of shutters. Then, later in the same month, the bookshop was vandalized again.

== See also ==
- Lavender Menace Bookshop
- List of LGBT bookstores
