= Bob Orr (bookseller) =

Robert W. Orr (born March 1950) is a bookseller based in Edinburgh, Scotland. Orr is best known as the co-founder of the Lavender Menace Bookshop, alongside Sigrid Nielsen.

== Early ventures ==
In the 1970s, Orr worked at the First of May, a now-defunct radical bookstore on Candlemaker Row, Edinburgh, which specialised in LGBT+ literature. In 1976, Orr invited Nielsen to join the Open Gaze bookstall, a gay and feminist books collective that he had begun as part of the Scottish Homosexual Rights Group’s (SHRG) Gay Information Centre on Broughton Street, Edinburgh. The Open Gaze was successful, but its radical catalogue faced a great deal of backlash, even from within the SHRG. In 1979, the collective was accused of either socialist leanings, or "selling a blasphemous greeting card", or both.

Orr's correspondence, publications, and papers (1974–1994), which explores these events and more, are archived in the manuscripts collection of the National Library of Scotland.

== Lavender Menace (1982–87) ==
In August 1982, Orr and Nielsen began a business partnership in order to set up Scotland's first gay bookshop, the Lavender Menace Bookshop on Forth Street, Edinburgh. In the same year, Orr summarised their queer bookselling ethos for "The Radical Bookseller":

"Gay bookshops, perhaps even more than other radical bookshops, don't exist simply to sell books. They are a space for lesbians and gay men to meet, leave messages — and feel central, not marginal. Even the most well-stocked radical bookshop sells gay books largely as a sideline, because of the sheer numbers of non-gay titles. In a society where we ourselves are a sideline, a space of our own where we can find a literature of our own is a good point for moving into wider activities."

In 1987, Lavender Menace shifted to Dundas Street, Edinburgh, under the name West & Wilde, and was run by Orr and Raymond Rose. The bookshop continued to trade in LGBT+ literature until 1997, when it closed operations due to financial concerns (which were in part due to two arson attacks at the premises).

== Revival of Lavender Menace ==
In 2017, the play Love Song to Lavender Menace debuted as a co-production between the playwright James Ley and the Royal Lyceum Theatre, Edinburgh. Ley had been inspired to produce the play, about the early years of Lavender Menace, after Orr had taken him on a tour of Edinburgh. Orr introduced Ley to important historical sites of queer bookselling in the city, all of which he had strong links to: the Open Gaze, Lavender Menace, and West & Wilde.

Inspired by the play's success, the 50th anniversary of the Stonewall riots, and a resurgence of interest in Edinburgh's queer literary history, Lavender Menace returned as a blog and pop-up bookstore in 2019, spearheaded by Orr and Sigrid Nielsen. As a digital and physical community archive, the Lavender Menace LGBT+ Book Archive preserves rare, out-of-print LGBT+ books and ephemera. Orr and Nielsen continue to speak and write about LGBT+ publishing and bookselling in and across Scotland.
