= Judd Books =

Arts and social sciences bookshop

Coordinates: 51.5260°N 0.1255°W

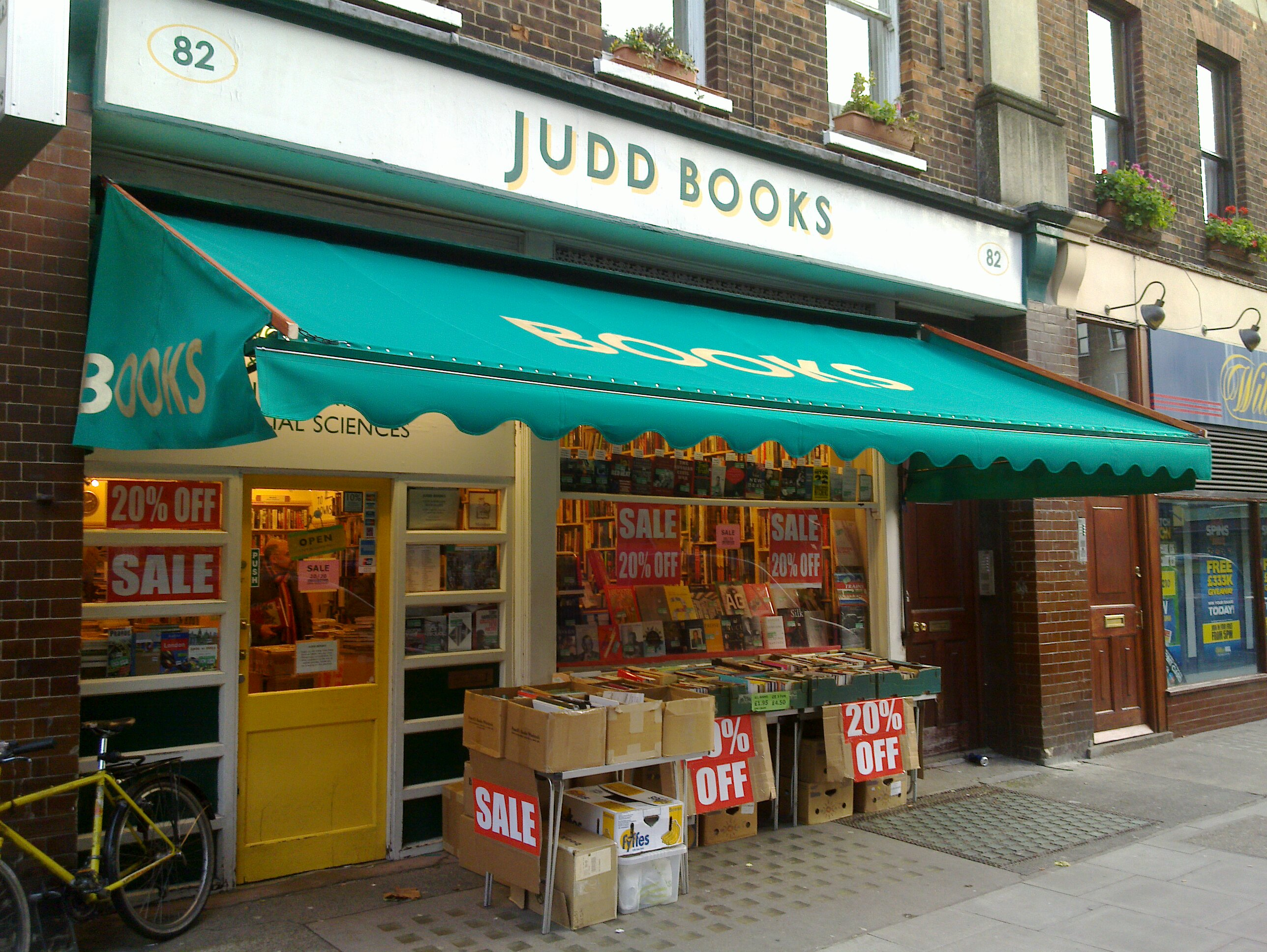
- Industry: Retail; Books
- Founded: 1992
- Founder: Nigel Kemp and Alexander Donaldson
- Headquarters: 82 Marchmont St, London WC1N 1AG
- Number of locations: 1 shop
- Website: Judd Books

Judd Books is a new and secondhand bookshop based near King's Cross and Russell Square, London, close to the British Library, that specialises in art and social science books.

== Overview ==
Judd Books operates across a ground floor and basement with around 50,000 titles available. The ground floor has books covering the arts, architecture, design, film, music, and literature whilst the basement includes ranges across history, philosophy, psychology, politics, economics, sociology, socialism, and other social science focuses.

Judd Books operates online through various online stores such as AbeBooks, Bookshop, and Biblio.

Judd Books is a member of the Provincial Booksellers Fair Association.

== History ==
Judd Books was originally founded within premises on Judd Street, London - hence its name. It opened a new shop on Marchmont Street, London and for a time operated two stores. Eventually the Judd Street store closed and their sole premises remains on Marchmont Street to this day.

In 2008, the Guardian outlined Judd Books as one of "London's finest bookshops".
