= Charlie's Queer Books =

Queer bookstore in Seattle, WA

Charlie's Queer Books is an independent bookstore located at 465 N 36th St in Seattle, Washington. The store was founded in 2023 by Charlie Hunts, a transgender man with a background in publishing and brand marketing. Charlie initially started with a mobile book cart covered in mirror tile and sold books at markets before opening the brick-and-mortar store in November 2023.

Charlie's Queer Books exclusively sells books by LGBTQ+ authors and/or prominently featuring LGBTQ+ themes and characters.

== Description ==
Charlie's Queer Books primarily sells queer literature. The bookstore carries fiction, non-fiction, poetry, and children's books, focusing on works by and about LGBTQ+ individuals. The store sells stickers, apparel, tote bags, craft kits, zines, and jewelry. It is considered to be part of a new wave of LGBTQ+ bookstores in the United States.

The store also hosts events, including book clubs, craft workshops, and educational workshops. Charlie Hunts, the store's co-owner, hoped that the store could be a queer third place that didn't revolve around drinking alcohol. He also wanted the store to represent a queer space outside of Capitol Hill. The store has an upstairs reading nook, and all of its walls are painted pink. There is a children's corner with family-friendly picture books, and shop decorations include art and quotes from authors like bell hooks. The store's romance section is organized by flags for different queer identities.

Before opening the brick-and-mortar store, Charlie was mentored by many of Seattle's bookselling legends including Michael Coy and Michael Wells of Bailey/Coy.

== History ==
Charlie Hunts was severely injured around 2012 and fell in love with reading books while recovering over the next year. He envisioned creating a bookstore that served only LGBTQ+ works. After getting an English degree and an MBA, he worked in the publishing and marketing industries while collecting LGBTQ+ literature, especially trans literature.

=== Cart ===
Charlie's Queer Books was founded by Hunts and his wife Madeline Burchard. Hunts began selling books out of a cart in the summer of 2023, attending Seattle's pride events. The cart was covered in disco tiles and Hunts transported it around town in his Subaru. Hunts also sold books online and ran social media for the shop. In the store's first social media campaign, they partnered with the Seattle Public Library and Seattle Arts & Lectures to suggest queer books that fit every square in the annual Summer Book Bingo.

=== Store ===
That November, the store expanded into a brick-and-mortar location in Fremont. Almost all of the store's books are written by queer authors, and the rest are written about queer topics with good representation of queer people. Hunts was cautious about safety while opening, adding protection, starting events slowly, and avoiding renting in locations they had been warned against, like Green Lake. They received some hateful comments on a viral video about the store, but Hunts said that the store had received less hate than other queer businesses in the pacific northwest, and less hate than he had expected, in its first few months. Part of the reason the store opened was as a response to anti-LGBTQ legislation and increased book bans.

==== Events ====
The store's first events included book clubs, on genres like historical fiction and romance. They also hosted craft nights and author talks. Heartstopper and works by TJ Klune were their best sellers in the first few months. During 2024 Pride Month, the store hosted special events and attended Seattle Pride celebrations.

In February 2025, the store hosted two weddings, something the store's owners had always hoped they could host in their shop. In April 2025, the Queer Silent Book Club began in Seattle, alternating between Charlie's Queer Books and Ada's Technical Books and Cafe every two weeks. On October 4, 2025, the 37th Lambda Literary Awards was hosted at Charlie's Queer Books, with the winners announced online from within the bookstore.

==== Halted orders ====
In November 2025, all of their book orders remained undelivered by UPS through the holiday season, despite repeated attempts to contact UPS. Hunts and Burchard estimated they lost a quarter of their expected holiday season earnings and were worried about the business's survival. By January, FOX 13 Seattle connected with UPS, which blamed the stopped deliveries on a mistake in their system that listed the store as temporarily closed. Hunts said that in their calls with UPS, employees were stymied by the issue and said they had never seen this happen before. Hunts worried that the error was maliciously created by someone.
