= Gay's the Word (bookshop) =

Lesbian and gay bookstore in London

Coordinates: 51.525361°N 0.125379°W

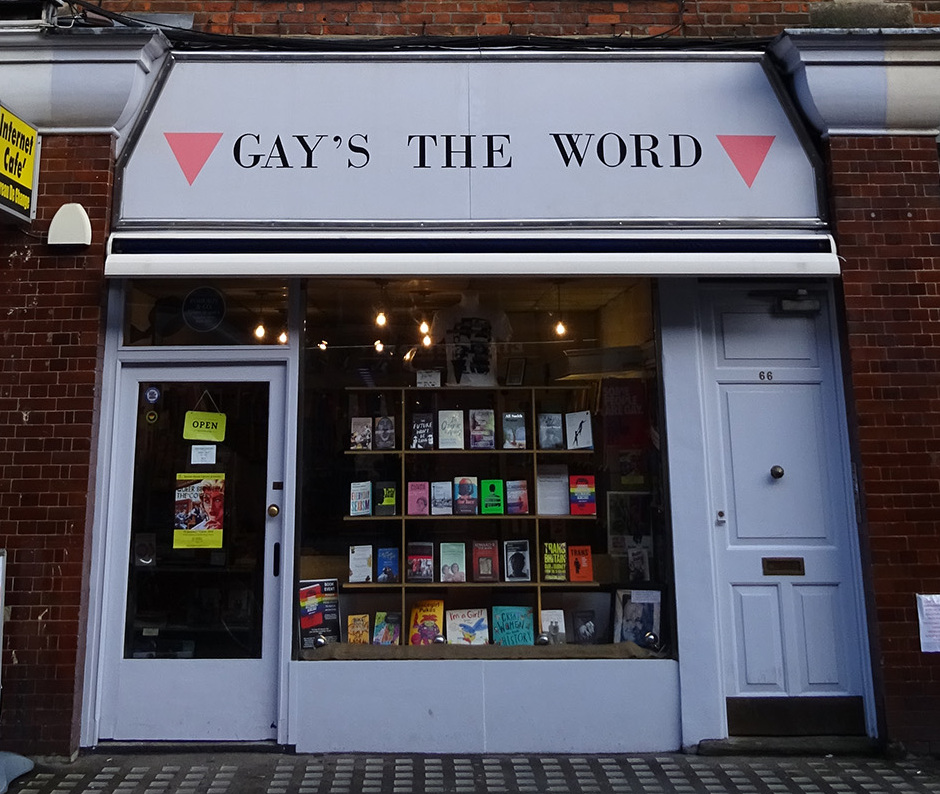
- Gay's the Word bookshop, January 2018
- Industry: Bookshop
- Founded: 17 January 1979
- Founder: Gay Icebreakers members
- Headquarters: London, WC1; United Kingdom
- Number of locations: 1
- Website: gaystheword.co.uk

Gay's the Word is an independent bookshop in central London, and the oldest LGBT bookshop in the United Kingdom. Inspired by the emergence and growth of lesbian and gay bookstores in the United States, a small group of people from Gay Icebreakers, a gay socialist group, founded the store in 1979. These included Peter Dorey, Ernest Hole and Jonathan Cutbill. Various locations were looked at, including Covent Garden, which was then being regenerated, before they decided to open the store in Marchmont Street in Bloomsbury, an area of the capital with rich academic and literary associations. Initial reluctance from Camden Council to grant a lease was overcome with help from Ken Livingstone, then a local councillor, later Mayor of London. For a period of time, it was the only LGBT bookshop in England.

== History ==
From the beginning, the bookshop was used as a community and information resource for lesbians and gay men providing information on gay organisations and forthcoming events. The shop hosted musical evenings and on the piano sat the score for the musical which inspired its name—Gay's the Word by Ivor Novello. Various organisations and community groups used the shop after hours for meetings. When the shop was founded in 1979, gay books were not generally available in ordinary bookstores. The early newsletters listed the few radical bookstores in the country where gay books were available and Gay News had an excellent and pioneering mail order service. The gay movement at this period in the United States was particularly vibrant and stimulated an immense amount of literature with many small publishing houses being established. Gay's the Word had to import a large part of its stock from the US as not enough gay books were published in the UK. Lesbian and gay publishing houses which were later established in the UK include Gay Men's Press, Brilliance Books and Onlywomen Press.

The shop has hosted many readings and signings by well-known and emerging writers. Edmund White, David Leavitt, Stella Duffy, Armistead Maupin, Jake Arnott, Damian Barr, Alan Hollinghurst, Philip Hensher, Charlotte Mendelson, Patrick Gale, Neil Bartlett, Alison Bechdel, Jake Shears, Emily M. Danforth, Ali Smith, Jackie Kay, Alex Bertie and Thomas Page McBee have read or done signings at the bookshop. It has hosted talks by biographers Neil McKenna (The Secret Life of Oscar Wilde), Sheila Rowbotham (Edward Carpenter); historians Matt Cook (A Gay History of Britain) and Matt Houlbrook (Queer London). A documentary on the bookshop was shown in 2006 at the London Lesbian and Gay Film Festival and can be viewed on YouTube.

Lesbians and Gays Support the Miners used to meet at the bookshop and collect money for the striking miners in 1984/85. When the meetings grew too large for the space they moved their meetings to the Fallen Angel pub. The 2014 film Pride, directed by Matthew Warchus, featured the group as they campaigned and raised money for striking Welsh miners and depicts the shop being a target for several instances of homophobic aggression and vandalism. Filming actually took place in a building on Kingsgate Road, West Hampstead. In 2017 a blue plaque was unveiled above the bookshop in honour of Mark Ashton, gay rights activist and co-founder of LGSM.

In 2018, Gay's the Word loaned part of their archive to Senate House Library for the Queer Between the Covers Exhibition. They gave a talk on the 1984 customs raid and subsequently were invited to repeat the talk at the Houses of Parliament. The 40th anniversary of Gay's the Word was marked by a special event at the British Library.

Gay's the Word has been subjected to a number of homophobic attacks over the years and the windows have been replaced many times. There was much relief when the last time the window was broken it was due to a burglary rather than homophobia. The store was broken into on 9 February 2020. The two burglars ransacked the bookshop, stole change from a charity collection tin and were arrested within the store when they stopped to drink a bottle of prosecco belonging to one of the staff. Gay's the Word re-opened the next day.

== Operation Tiger Raid ==
In 1984, Customs and Excise, assuming the shop to be a porn store rather than a serious bookstore, mounted a large-scale raid known as "Operation Tiger" where they seized thousands of pounds' worth of stock. The books seized covered many categories of books stocked by Gay's The Word. The directors were charged with conspiracy to import indecent books under the Customs Consolidation Act 1876 (39 & 40 Vict. c. 36). Unlike the situation with the Obscene Publications Act, which governs literature published in the UK, the Customs Consolidation Act 1876 does not provide for a literary or artistic defence of titles. A campaign was started, and the charges were vigorously defended. A defence fund was raised over £55,000 from the public. Many well-known writers also gave their support, and Gore Vidal donated £3,000. Newspaper articles appeared, various MPs visited the shop and questions were asked in the House of Commons. The charges were eventually dropped in 1986.

"I examined a parcel on 13 February 1981. I had selected it because it was addressed to the Gay's the Word bookshop which suggested a homosexual content"... Mr Riley said that he found copies of the book The Joy of Gay Sex in the parcel.

— Customs Officer at the North London Magistrates' court, 25 June 1985

== Campaigns ==
In 2007, with rising rents and the effect of Internet book-buying, the bookshop faced possible closure. It launched a campaign to stay open which received coverage in newspapers such as The Guardian, The Times and The Independent, as well as the gay press of QX and Boyz. Enough money was raised to pay bills and help the bookshop retrench.

== See also ==
- Silver Moon Bookshop, a women's bookshop in London
- LGBT culture in London
- List of LGBT bookstores
- Category Is Books, LGBT bookshop in Glasgow
- Lavender Menace Bookshop, former LGBT bookshop in Edinburgh
