= Priape =

Sex shop chain in Canada

- Industry: sex shop
- Founded: 1974
- Founder: Robert Duchaîne and Claude Leblanc

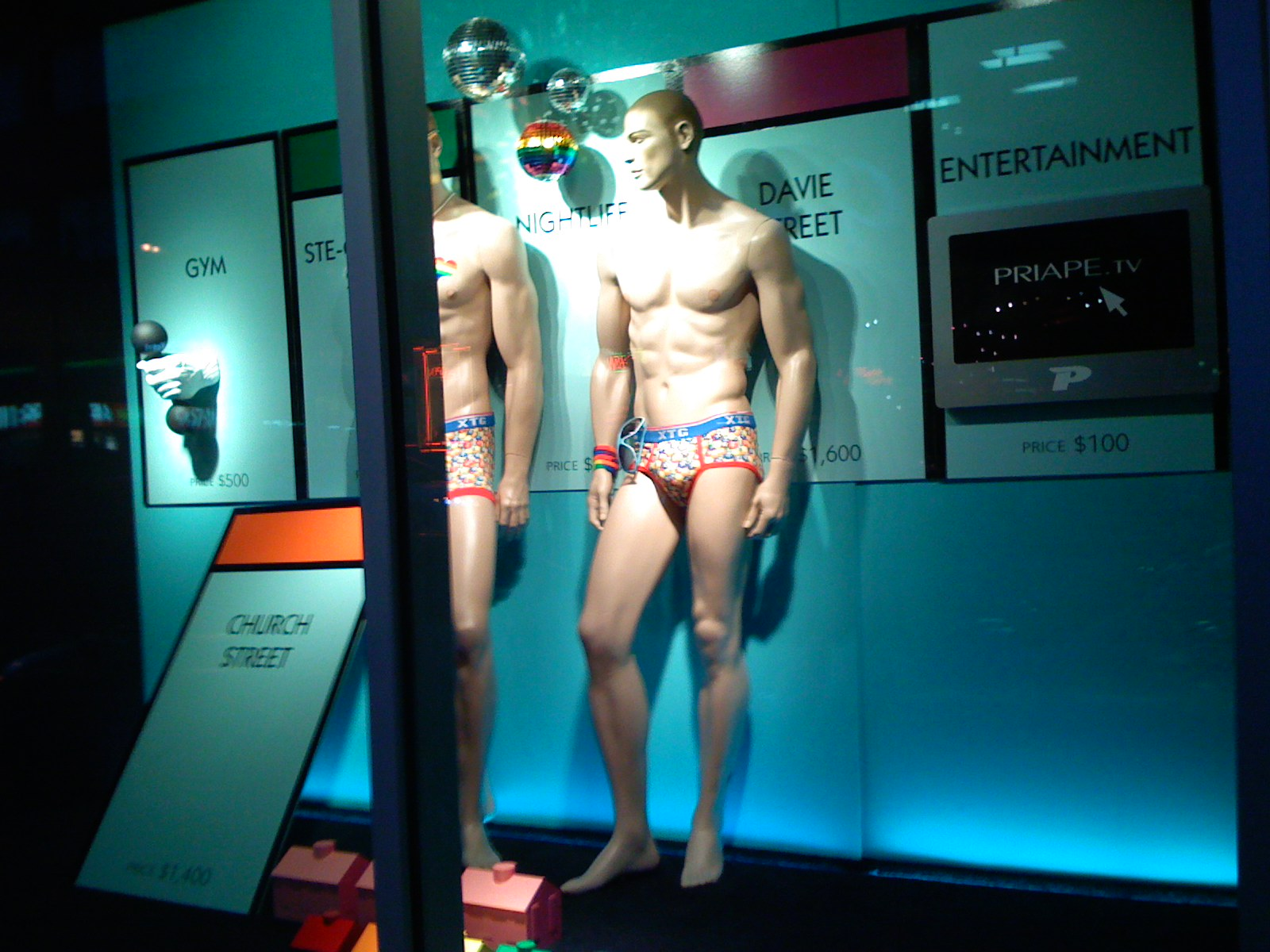
Priape Store in Church Street, Toronto

Priape (meaning Priapus in French) is a privately held Canadian company, headquartered in Montreal, Quebec. Priape owned and operated several retail stores specializing in DVDs, books, clothing, leather, sex toys, and other products that appeal to the gay consumer.

The company was founded in Montreal, Quebec in 1974 by Robert Duchaîne and Claude Leblanc, originally at 1111 De Maisonneuve Boulevard. The flagship store moved to 1661 Rue Sainte-Catherine East in 1975, and then to 1311 rue Sainte-Catherine in 1987. Additional Priape stores opened in Toronto, Ontario, in 1998, Calgary, Alberta, in 2004, and Vancouver, British Columbia, in 2005. In 2001, the chain's then-owner, Bernard Rousseau, purchased Montreal's Librairie L'Androgyne bookstore, although he closed that store within a year due to declining sales.

In 2011, the store briefly became an international news story when Greg Davis, the then-mayor of Southaven, Mississippi, came out as gay after a forensic audit of his expense claims revealed that he had made a purchase at the store during a business trip to Toronto.

The company also operated ManWear, which designed and sold t-shirts, tank tops, jeans, and accessories. Priape was also a minority investor in Maleflixxx Television, a Canadian subscription cable channel offering gay porn programming.

The company filed for bankruptcy protection on 27 June 2013. All four of its stores across Canada were closed the morning of 21 October. On 30 October, a Quebec Superior Court hearing approved a purchase offer by former general manager Denis Leblanc and theatre producer Stephen Pevner; under its new ownership, the flagship store in Montreal and the website, Priape.com, have reopened while the Toronto, Vancouver, and Calgary stores remain closed; however, other stores in those cities carry selections of Priape-branded merchandise.
