= Sigrid Nielsen =

Co-founder of Lavender Menace Bookshop, Scotland

- Born: March 1948 (age 78)

Sigrid Catherine Nielsen (born March 1948) is best known as the co-founder and co-owner of Scotland's first gay bookshop, Lavender Menace Bookshop.

== Life and career ==
Sigrid grew up in America, before settling in Scotland. Once in Scotland, she assisted Sylvia Neri in managing a Scottish Minorities Group (SMG) (now Outright Scotland) Women's Group, in 1975–1976. However, Neri noted that Sigrid could only do it for a short time, as she had so many commitments.

Sigrid teamed up with business partner Bob Orr to run a bookstall at the Scottish Homosexual Rights Group (SHRG) on Broughton Street in 1976, Edinburgh. Trading initially under the name Lavender Books, they named the bookstall Open Gaze.

This eventually became what is now known as the Lavender Menace Bookshop.

== Writing ==
Sigrid went on to co-edit a book with Gail Chester, In Other Words Writing as a Feminist, in 1987. This radical feminist perspective of women’s publishing brings attention to the significance of writing for women's liberation.

At this time Sigrid contributed to LGBTQ+ newspaper, The Pink Paper, including a column entitled: Fortune, fame and the feminist (1988).

== See also ==
- List of LGBT bookstores
- LGBT culture
- List of feminists
