= Marchmont Street =

Street in London

Coordinates: 51.5247°N 0.1250°W

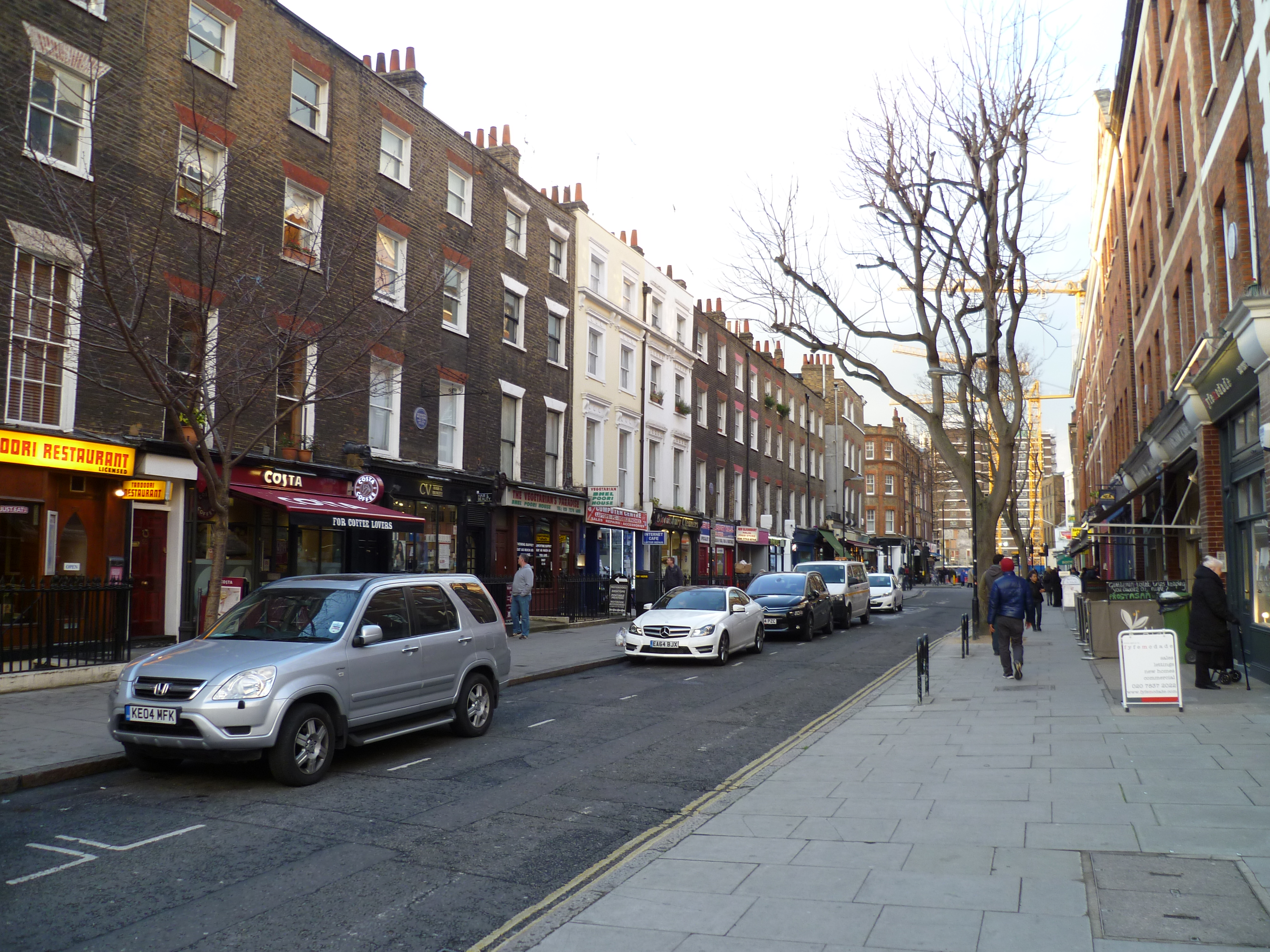
The Grade II-listed north-western side of the street, which serves as the local area's high street

Marchmont Street is located in the London Borough of Camden. It is the main high street serving southern Kings Cross and eastern Bloomsbury. It links the Brunswick Centre and Russell Square tube station at its south to Tavistock Place at its north, where it becomes Cartwright Gardens.

The street is almost entirely commercial, with small retailers covering the northern half of the street, and a large hotel and the regenerated shopping centre covering the southern half. The Marchmont Association, which serves the entirety of the area between Woburn Place and Gray's Inn Road, is based on Marchmont Street, where it has a street-front office. The street is home to Gay's The Word – one of three LGBT bookshops in the country – and The School of Life.

The street was built in the first decade of the 19th century. Most of the western side of Marchmont Street (numbers 39–73) is Grade-II listed, as is the Brunswick Centre, which makes up most of its eastern side.

The English actor and comedian Kenneth Williams lived on the street for a significant time, and is honoured with a blue plaque on his former residence.
