= Unabridged Bookstore =

Bookstore in Chicago, Illinois, United States

Coordinates: 41.9416°N 87.6443°W

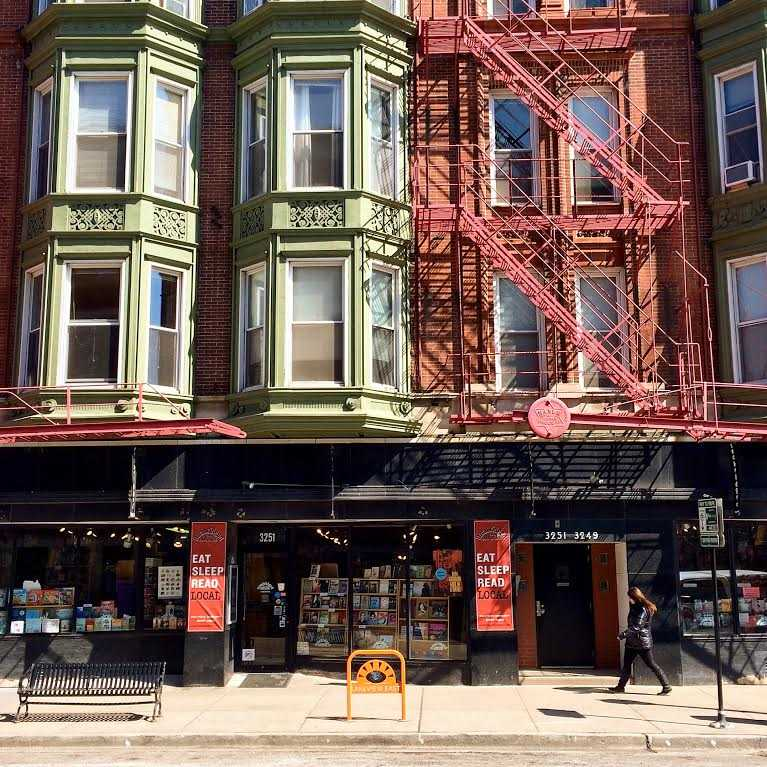
- Lakeview, Chicago, 2015
- Company type: Book store
- Founded: 1980
- Founder: Edward Devereux
- Headquarters: Chicago, Illinois, United States
- Owner: Edward Devereux
- Website: unabridgedbookstore.com

Unabridged Bookstore is an independent bookstore started in 1980 by Edward Devereux. Unabridged Bookstore opened on November 1, 1980, with two business partners and $18,000. Unabridged Bookstore is known for its dedicated and knowledgeable staff. Hand-written, personal recommendations from employees line the shelves.

== History ==
=== 20th century ===
Starting as a single storefront on the 3200 block of North Broadway in the Lakeview neighborhood of Chicago, the store expanded to occupy three storefronts and became one of its biggest independent bookstores. It is one of the oldest independent bookstores in Chicago and one of the only bookstores in the city focused on LGBTQ literature, "viewed as somewhat of a radical business plan" since its opening in the 1980s. Over the years the bookstore has become known for its chalkboard quotes and "its large selection of LGBTQ titles." Unabridged Bookstore has specialized in selling well-known and obscure gay and lesbian literature
