= Brilliance Books =

Former gay and lesbian publishing company based in London

Brilliance Books was a small publisher of gay and lesbian books based in Clerkenwell, London, set up in 1982 with funding from the GLC. Brilliance Books published a range of fiction and non-fiction works including David Wurtzel's Thomas Lyster: a Cambridge Novel and Title Fight, the account of UK newspaper Gay News by Gillian E. Hanscombe and its co-founder Andrew Lumsden. It also re-published earlier works of gay and lesbian literature, including Alice B. Toklas's The Alice B. Toklas Cook Book, and a 1984 edition of The Chinese Garden by Rosemary Manning originally published in 1961.

The publishing company was run by Roy Trevelion and Tenebris Light. Author Jeanette Winterson worked there as the women's editor in 1983.
