= Fembooks =

Women's bookstore in Taipei, Taiwan

Fembooks (女書店)
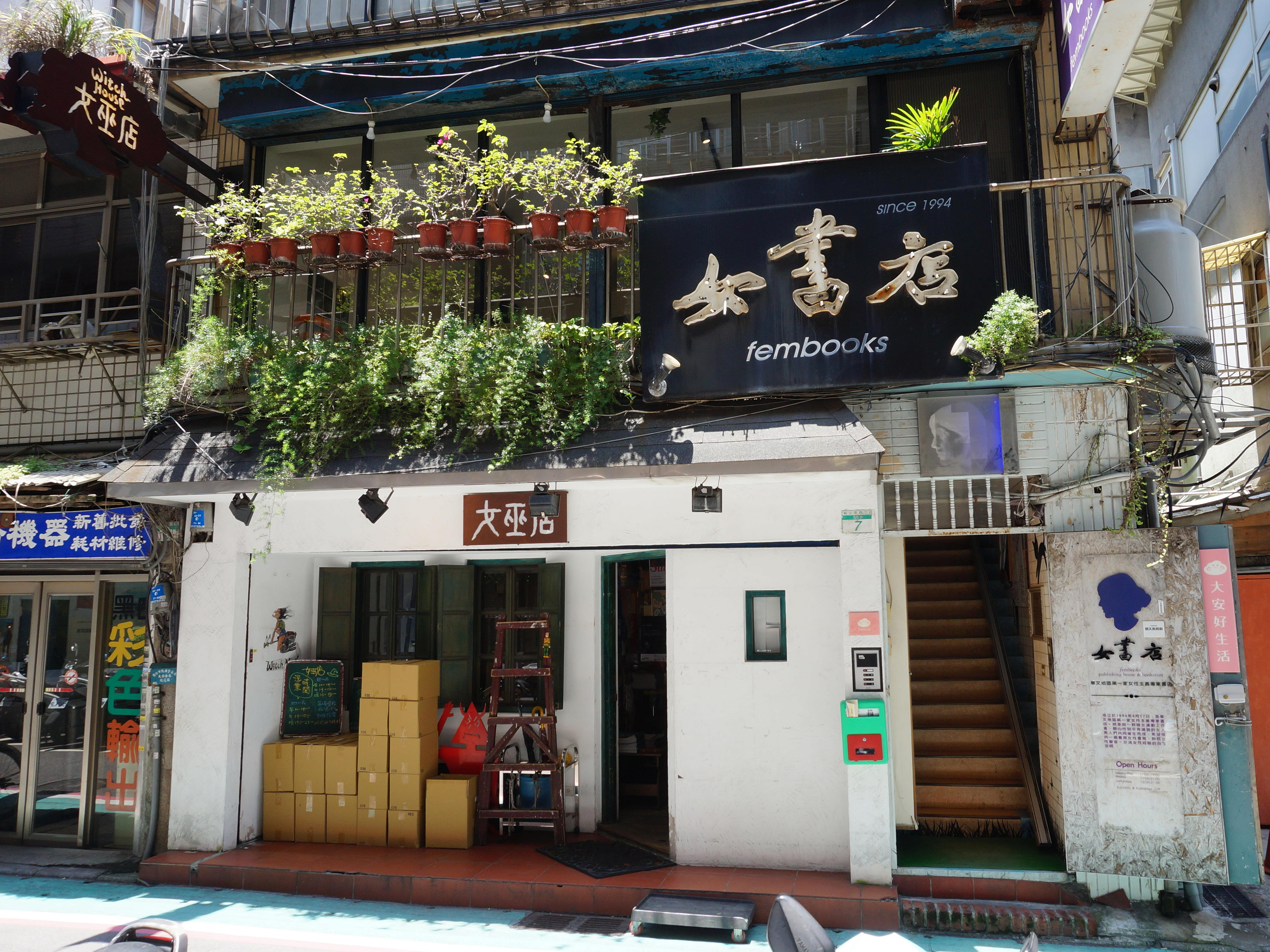
- Street view of the retail store
- Company type: public limited company
- Founded: 1994; 32 years ago
- Headquarters: Xinsheng S. Rd., Taipeh, Taiwan
- Key people: Li Xiumei (Sophie)
- Website: www.fembooks.com.tw

Fembooks (in Chinese 女書店) is a bookstore based in Taipei, Taiwan, which was opened in 1994 as the first feminist bookstore in the Chinese-speaking world. Fembooks represents a milestone in the women's movement in the Chinese world. In 2007, Fembooks was honored by being desnigated as a 'Landmark of Women's Culture' in Taiwan. Over the course of its existence, the range of services provided has expanded, including adding a publishing house, and also operating as an event venue with a café. Its business model as a public limited company is noteworthy.

== Origins ==
=== Political background ===
Taiwan has a turbulent political history. Since the incident of February 28, 1947, martial law prevailed in Taiwan for decades. Martial law restricted freedom of expression and freedom of assembly. Courageous citizens founded an underground book club to exchange knowledge and information and strive for reform. The emergency laws were gradually lifted, and in 1987, the state of emergency was finally ended. Since 1987, the formation of new political parties has been permitted. In 1992, the first free and general parliamentary elections in Taiwan took place.

=== Women's movement ===
Even during martial law, the magazine Awakening Magazine Publishing House was published to promote gender equality. After martial law was lifted, underground movements came to the surface, including the women's movement. Committed women launched projects to promote greater equality. As an offshoot of this magazine, the first women's movement organization in Taiwan, the Awakening Foundation, was established. Unlike mainland China, Taiwan's more democratic development provided a political climate in which citizens' initiatives flourished. These were good conditions for the women's bookstore. The plan at the time was for the store to finance the women's movement.

=== Foundation ===
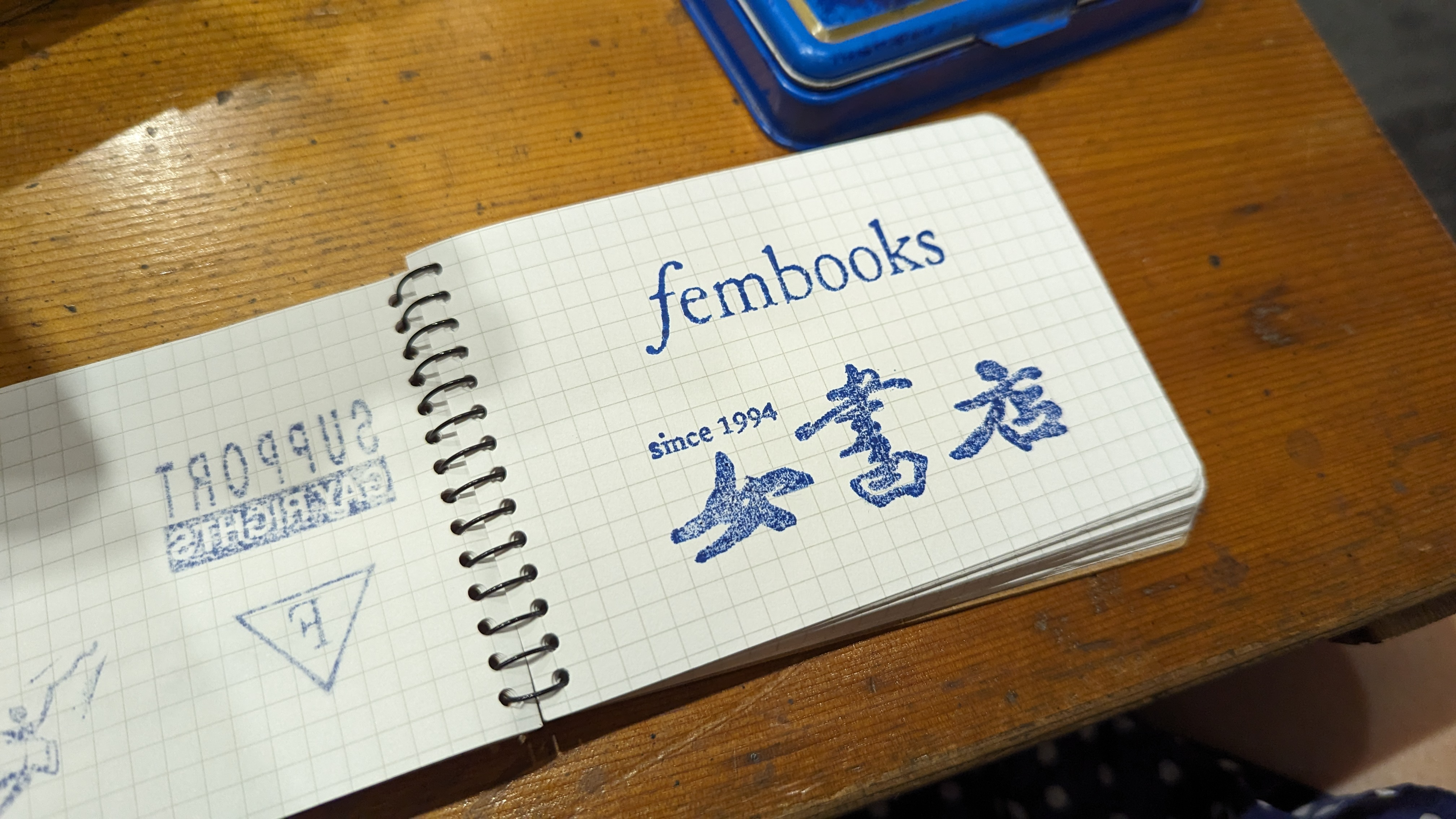
Stamp with lettering

Fembooks was founded primarily by a group of activists and supporters of the Awakening Foundation. It was officially established on April 17, 1994 by Li Yuan-zheng and Zheng Zhi-hui. The first of 600 customers who support the store in the long term through cash deposits was a man: a doctor from New Taipei City. The store is located near the campus of National Taiwan University.

The English name of the bookstore is (in its own spelling) fembooks; the Chinese name 女書店 could be translated as “female bookstore.” The name of the bookstore was inspired by the Chinese women's script Nüshu, a writing system developed by women and used exclusively by them. The Chinese name was designed by the well-known Taiwanese calligrapher Tong Yang-tze (董陽孜).

Fembooks' motto is "written by women, about women, for women". The bookstore's mission is to “promote the women's movement through cultural influences” and to strengthen women's self-confidence.

Two years after its founding, in 1996, Fembooks expanded its business to include a literary publishing house, which still exists today. The first book published was "The Awakening" by Kate Chopin. The publishing house has published hundreds of books on gender issues, divided into several categories.

== Legacy ==
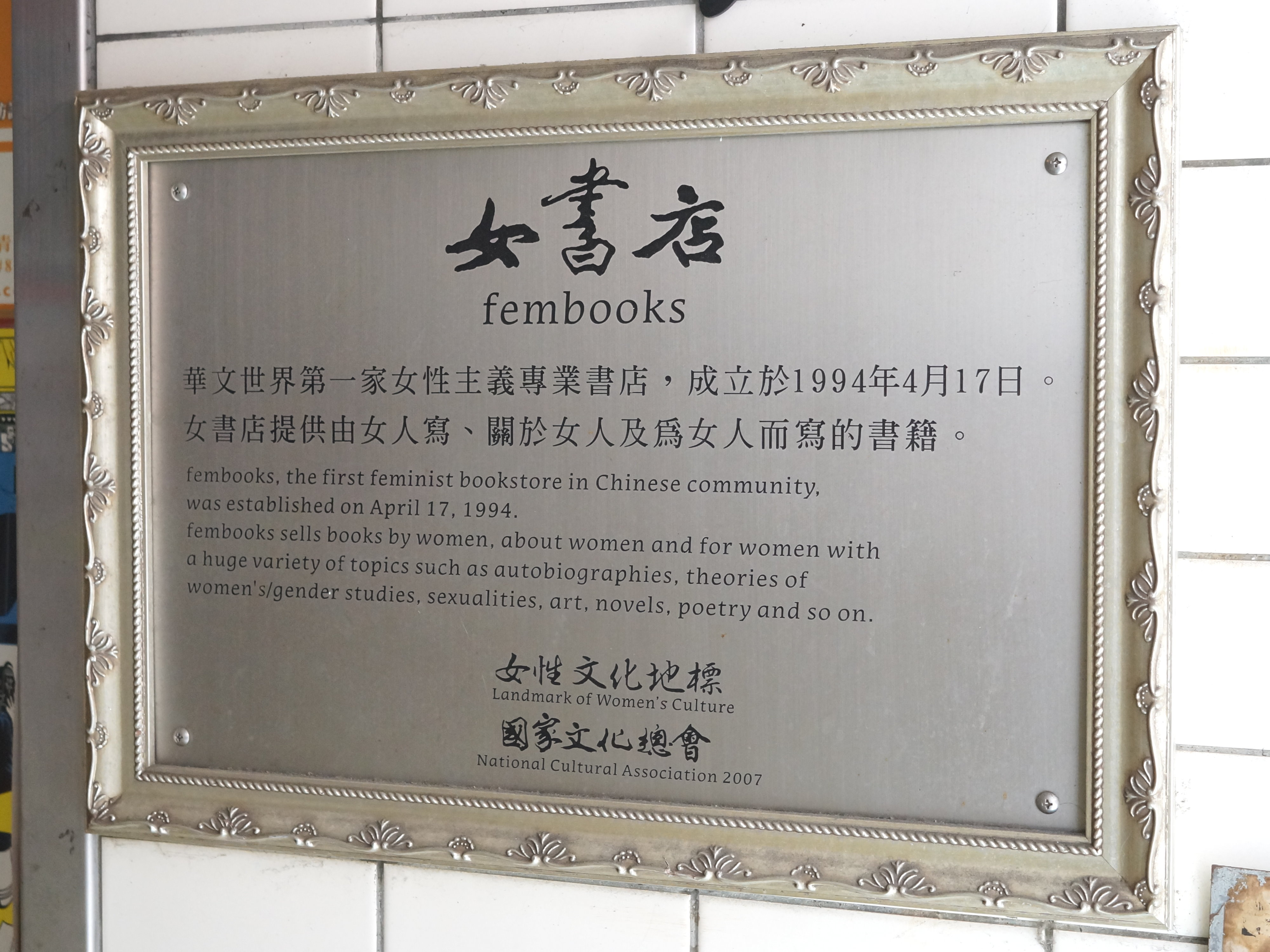
Awarded title of Landmark of Women's Culture in Taiwan

Fembooks was the first feminist bookstore in the Chinese-speaking world. It attracted buyers from outside Taiwan early on, from Hong Kong, China, and Southeast Asia. In 2007, it was awarded the title of Landmark of Women's Culture in Taiwan.

The company is politically active. In 2006, Fembooks joined the civil society group “Abolition of Penalty 235 Action Alliance,” which campaigned for a constitutional amendment or abolition of Article 235 of the Criminal Code of the Republic of China, which prohibited the distribution of “obscene materials.” Inspired by Fembooks, Asia's first LGBT bookstore, GinGin, opened in the neighborhood five years later. This store also became a symbol for gender issues. In 2007, Fembooks supported GinGin in a legal dispute. Taiwan is the first Asian country to recognize same-sex marriage since 2019. Fembooks is also credited with playing a role in this development.

== Operations ==
=== Range ===
The assortment includes local, national, and international specialist books, non-fiction, biographies, novels, poetry, and films for readers of different ages and backgrounds Office space is also available for rent. Fembooks regularly organizes a series of feminist courses, activities, and book launches. Readings, art exhibitions, and festivals are organized. In addition, panel discussions are offered and the store premises are rented out as a venue. New visitor groups are also reached via social platforms. The store operates a café. Manager Sophie Lee stated in 2021 that the store had become a meeting place where parents and children spend time together.

== Business model in transition ==
In 2003, the business was saved from closure after a professor at National Taiwan University initiated a fundraising campaign.

Over time since its founding, the range has been expanded to include the aspect of gender diversity. Topics such as queer rights, homosexuality, and men's studies have opened up new customer groups. Since the late 2010s, men have increasingly become part of the customer base.

The negative market development in the book industry did not spare Fembooks. During a campaign to save the store in 2017, money was raised with the help of authors such as the English-language poet Nicholas Wong from Hong Kong. Nevertheless, Fembooks had to cease its day-to-day business in July 2017 due to unsustainable losses. The monthly deficit was between NT$50,000 and NT$70,000. In 2017, the store had more than 600 regular customers with customer accounts.

The business model relies on small private investors. At the time of the partial closure in 2017, the business had 55 shareholders, including three men. However, the investments were not sufficient to offset the business's deficit. Nevertheless, not having large investors was seen as an advantage because it meant that the founders did not have to abandon their mission.

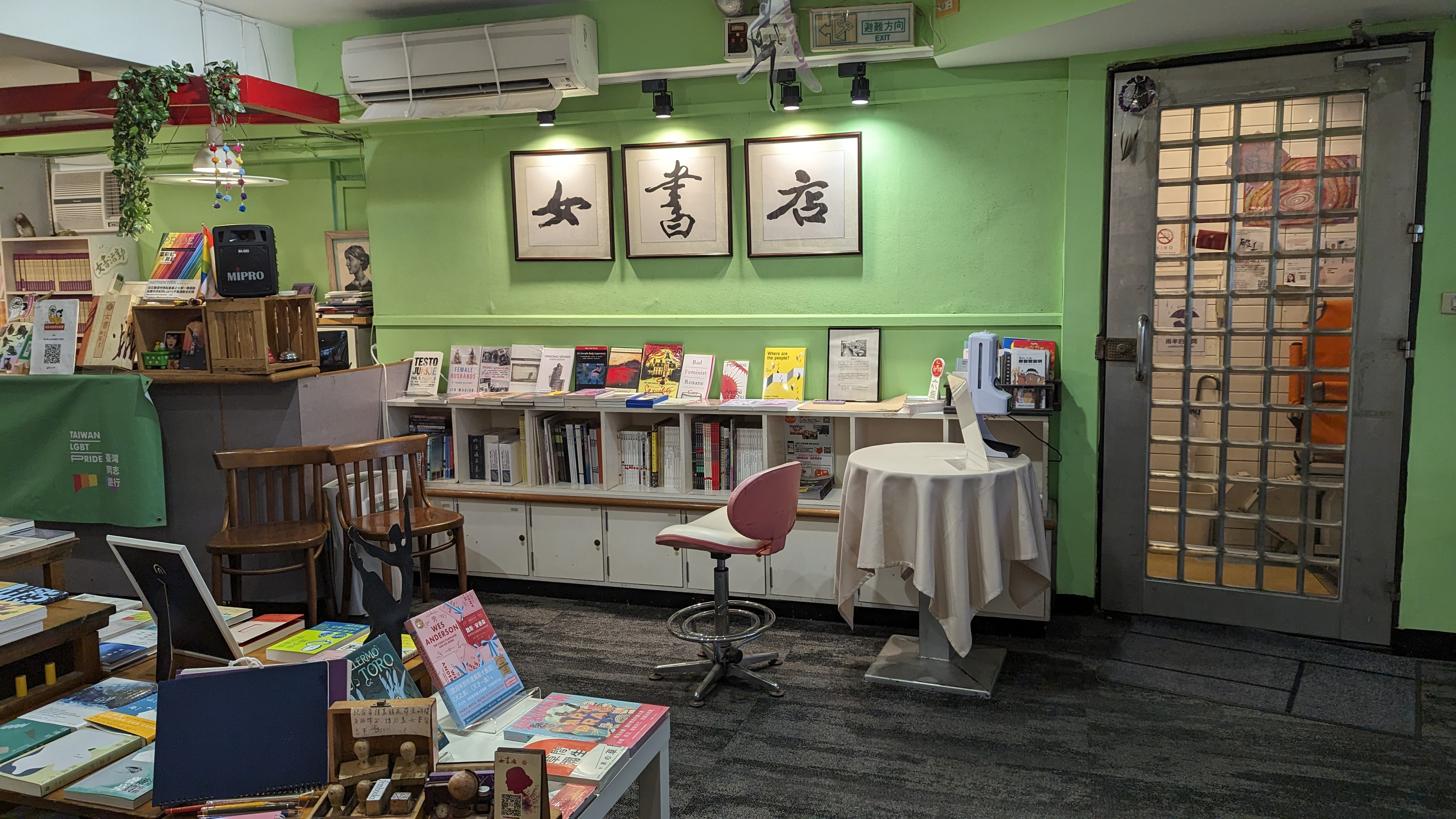
Interior view after the renovation

The publishing business continued during the temporary closure. Sales and communication via the Internet and publications were also unaffected by the closure. Branch manager Yang Ying-ying (楊瑛瑛) described this turning point with the words: “We have reached rock bottom, but I believe that a young person with new business ideas can give the company a new direction.” At a shareholders' meeting, a new manager was elected and the finances were restructured. The premises were renovated and the store was able to reopen with a new concept the following year.

Increasing digitalization and, not least, the COVID-19 pandemic are once again making it difficult for bookstores to survive in the 2020s by selling books alone. The range of services has been expanded to include event locations. In 2021, there was a desire to transform Fembooks into a non-profit organization in order to make the greatest possible contribution to the common good without having to worry about revenue.

== Gallery ==
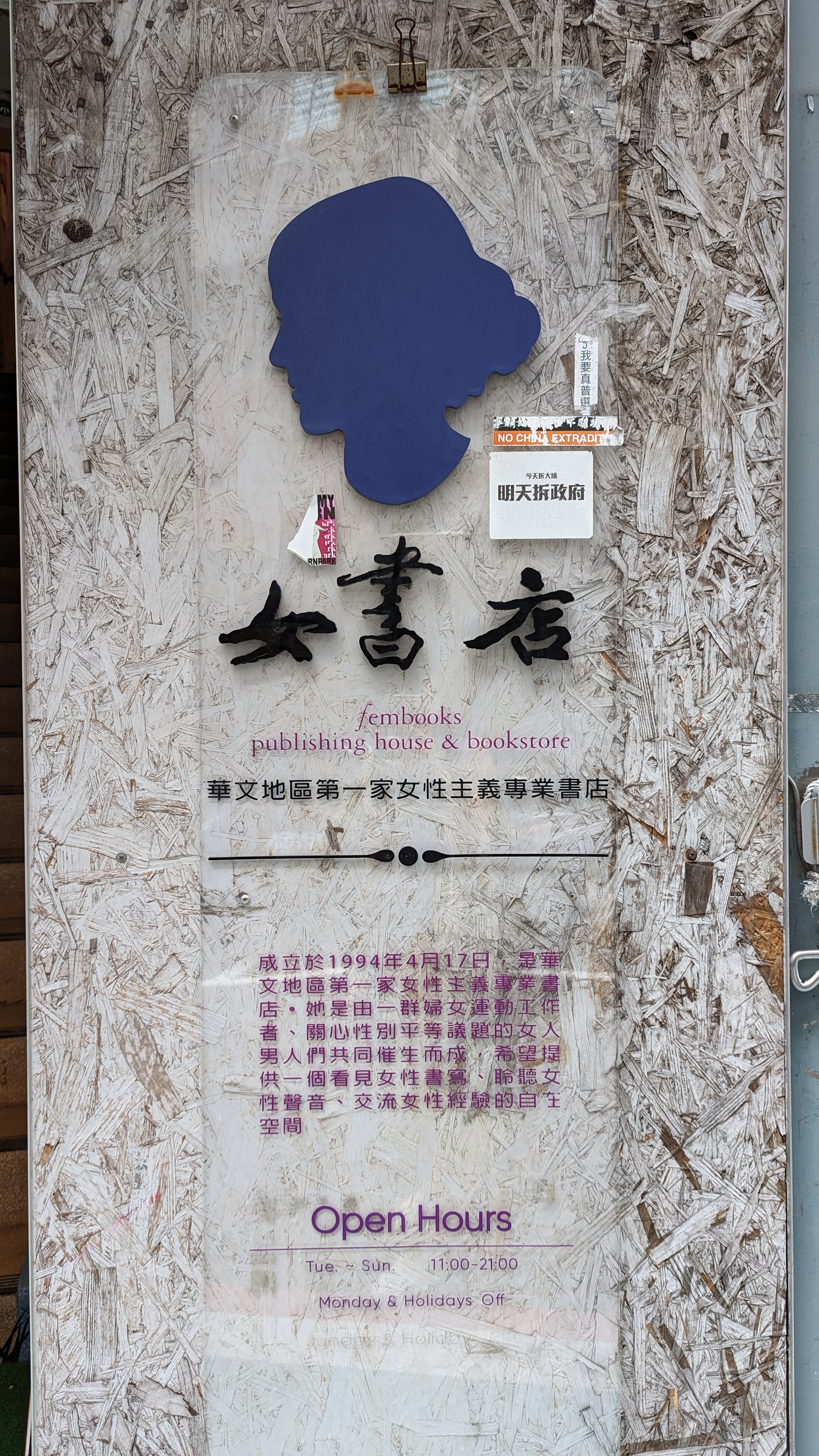
Entrance sign at street level

== See also ==
- Bluestockings (bookstore)
- List of LGBTQ bookstores
