= Yu & Me Books =

Bookstore in Chinatown, Manhattan

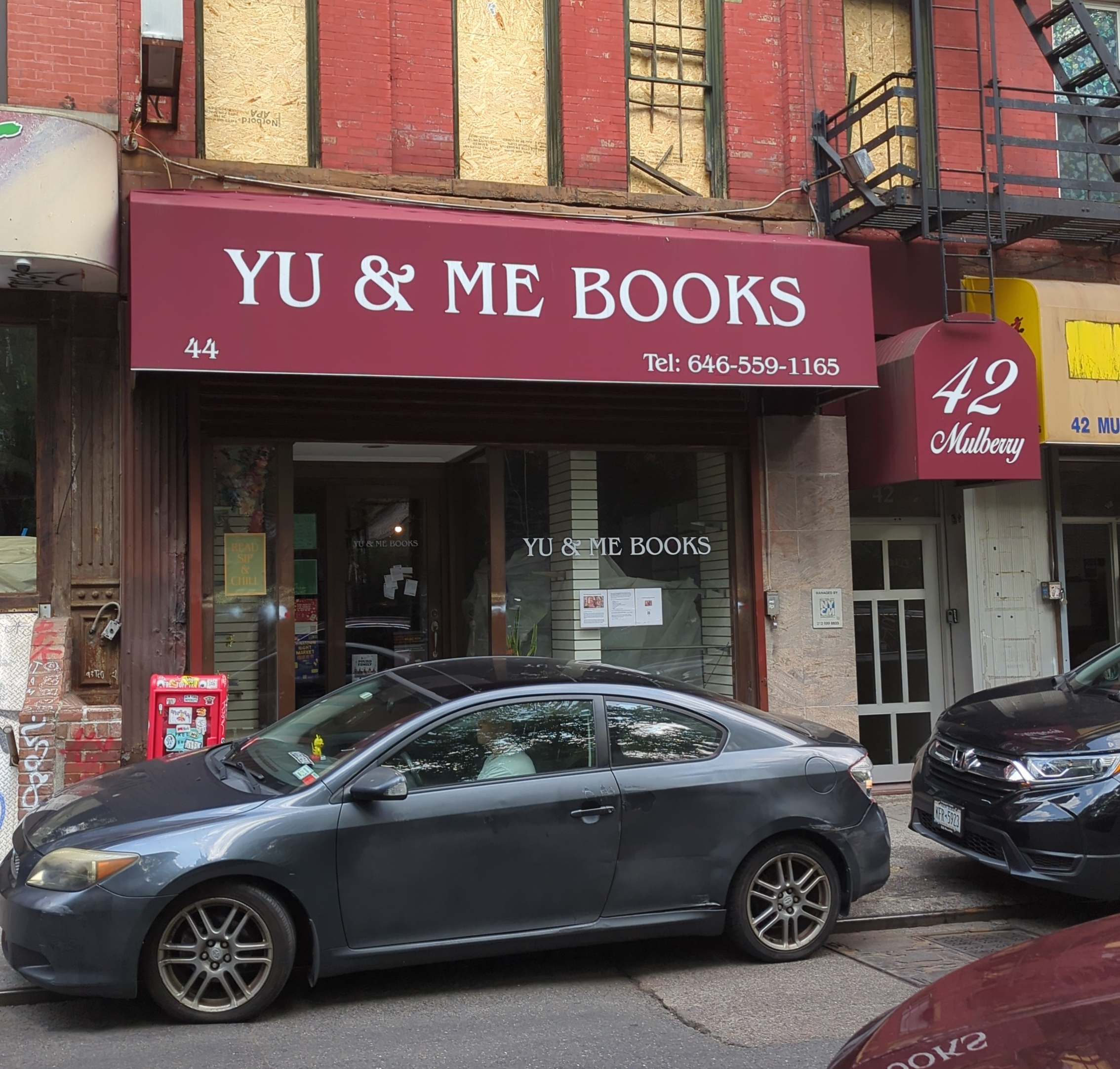

General information
- Location: 44 Mulberry Street; New York, NY 10013
- Coordinates: 40°42′54″N 73°59′58″W

Yu & Me Books is an independent bookstore in Chinatown, Manhattan. It is the first queer Asian American bookstore, as well as the only bookstore owned by an Asian American woman in New York City. The bookstore sells books relevant to the Asian American diaspora and has hosted events with authors like Ocean Vuong, Sayaka Murata, and Hua Hsu. In 2023, the bookstore was closed following a residential unit fire and, after a community fundraising and rebuilding effort, reopened for business seven months later at its original Mulberry Street location.

== History ==
=== Founding ===
Lucy Yu, an avid reader while growing up in Los Angeles, had a dream to someday run a coffee shop and bookstore. With a career in chemical engineering and supply chain management, Yu was working at a food startup in New York City during the COVID-19 pandemic when she began envisioning and planning out her idea for a bookstore.

Despite reported decline in American bookselling due to the COVID-19 pandemic, Yu decided to open a bookstore in Manhattan's Chinatown. With help from a GoFundMe which raised around $16,000, as well as tens of thousands of dollars from her own savings, Yu opened Yu & Me Books in December of 2021, making it the first and only bookstore in New York City owned by an Asian American woman in the city. With its launch coinciding with a spike in hate crimes toward Asian Americans, Yu intended the bookstore to be not merely an inventory of books relevant to the community but also a safe space for its members. In addition to selling books, Yu hosted events with authors, open mics, and even plant-potting workshops.

=== Fire ===
On the Fourth of July in 2023, a fire broke out in a residential unit above the bookstore, killing a tenant named Frank Yee and causing serious damage to the entire building that prompted the bookstore's closure. Over a thousand books were permanently damaged.

Immediately, Yu started a GoFundMe after forecasting that $60,000 would be needed to replace inventory and $80,000 would be needed to rebuild the bookstore. Within a day, Yu raised over $230,000 from thousands of supporters, including Simu Liu and Celeste Ng, and the fundraiser would raise a total of $369,555 by its end.

Funds were also raised through events, such as a reading with Hua Hsu at the New Design High School, as well as solidarity efforts by fellow booksellers like Archestratus Books, Astoria Bookshop, Books Are Magic, and Book Club Bar. At an auction meant to raise funds for the bookstore, prizes like a dinner with actor Randall Park were raffled. While tending to its reconstruction with landlords and contractors, Yu sold books and ran events out of several temporary pop-up shops and later Market Line Food Hall. Welcome to Chinatown, a local nonprofit, offered storage space to hold Yu's remaining inventory in the meantime, while Golden Diner, a nearby restaurant, helped Yu with insurance and sketching out a timeline.

Yu predicted that renovations and a subsequent reopening would take a year, but the bookstore instead opened up after seven months on January 28, 2024. Many authors, booksellers, and members of the community came out to celebrate, including Min Jin Lee. In addition to having rebuilt the original storefront, Yu had also remodeled its basement to shelve more inventory and provide seating for customers.

=== Events ===
Past events at Yu & Me Books have included Sally Wen Mao, Neema Avashia, Nini Nguyen, Anton Hur, Susan Bernofsky, Sam Bett, Ocean Vuong, Marie Myung-Ok Lee, and Sayaka Murata. The bookstore also hosted a Lunar New Year pop-up with the Metropolitan Museum of Art to support Soar over Hate, a nonprofit.

For the release of The City and Its Uncertain Walls by Haruki Murakami, the bookstore will be one of eight bookstores across the United States to hold a Murakami Midnight Party on November 18, 2024.
