= The Bookshop Darlinghurst =

- Interactive map of the The Bookshop Darlinghurst area

General information
- Status: Closed
- Type: LGBT bookshop
- Location: Sydney, Australia
- Opened: 1982
- Closed: 24 December 2025
- Owner: Charles Gregory (2024–2025); Les McDonald (1982–2024)

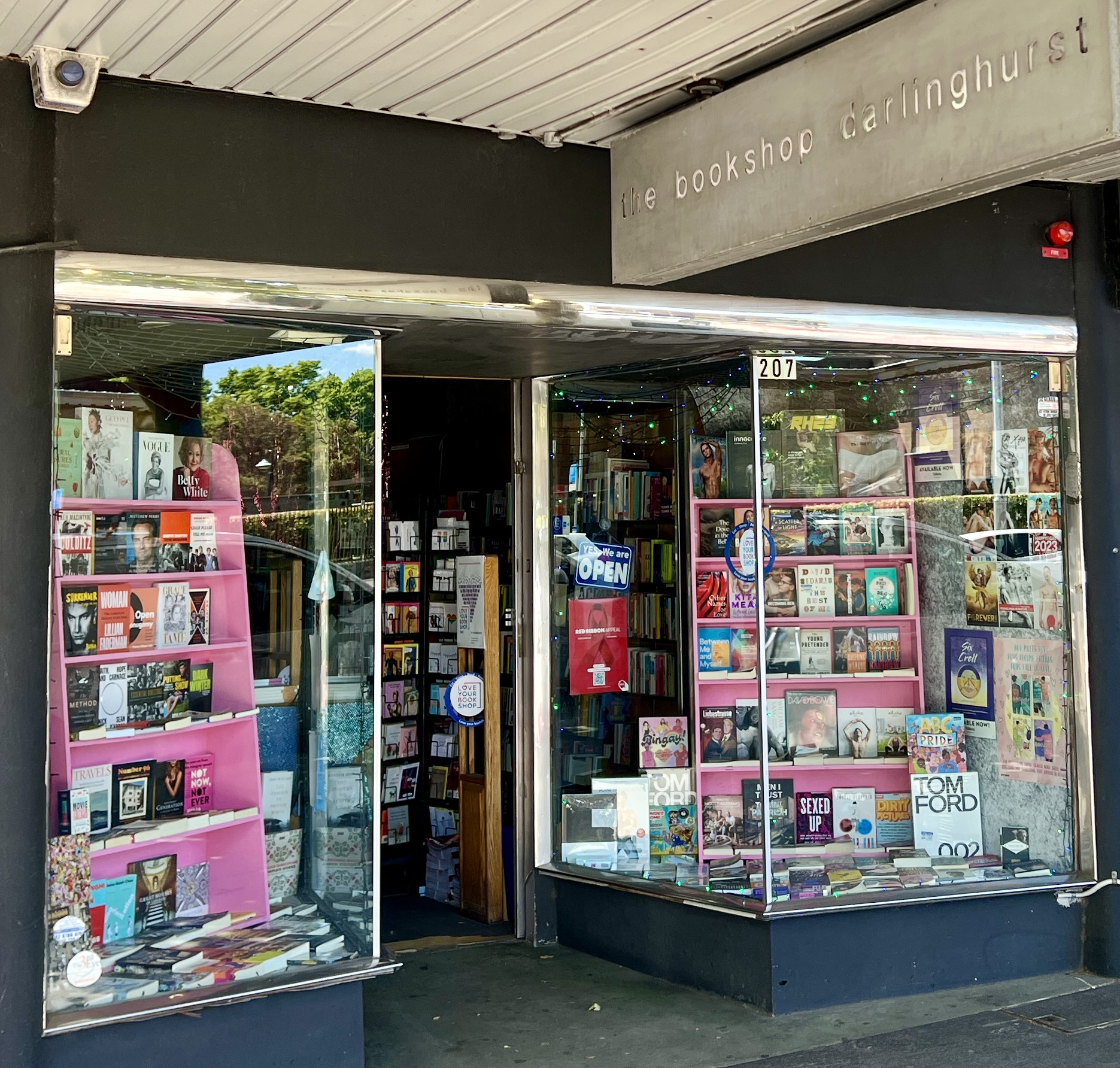
The Bookshop Darlinghurst in 2022

The Bookshop Darlinghurst was an LGBT bookshop in Sydney, Australia.

The bookshop was founded in 1982. The co-founders were Wayne Harrison and Les McDonald.

During the 1980s, the bookshop played a role in providing information and support in the face of the HIV/AIDS pandemic.

In mid-2024, Les McDonald transferred ownership of the shop to Charles Gregory, a former worker at the shop.

The bookshop closed on 24 December 2025, due to the financial effects of a planned move being repeatedly delayed by the developer.
