= Librairie L'Androgyne =

Coordinates: 45°31′03.3″N 73°33′28.1″W

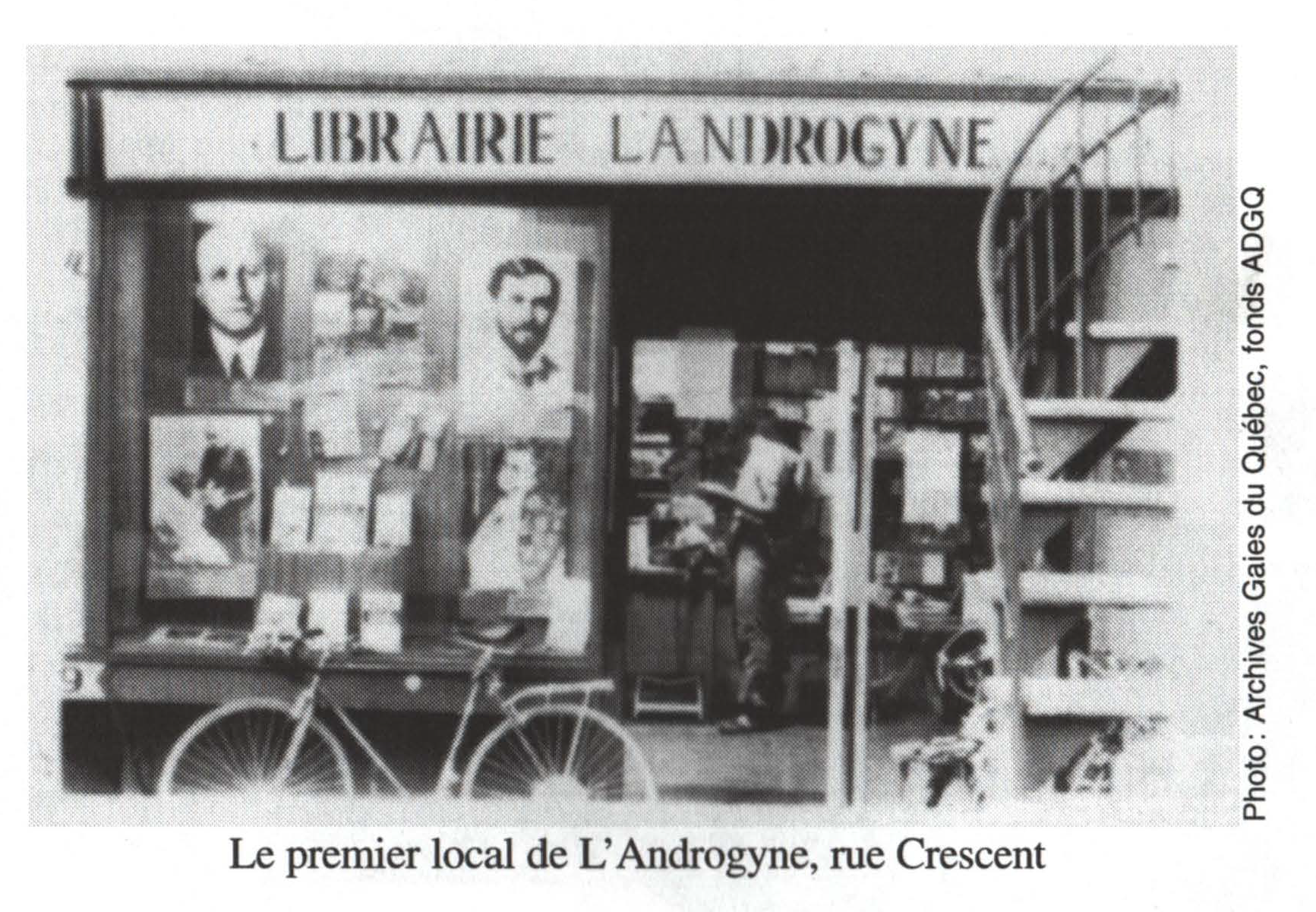

General information
- Type: Book store
- Opened: 1973
- Closed: 2002

Librairie L'Androgyne was a gay, lesbian, feminist bookstore in Montreal, Quebec, Canada, active from 1973 to 2002.

Founded in the fall of 1973 by Will Aitken and Bruce Garside (the active partners), and John Southin (who did not work on the store but put up capital). Barbara Scales was active in setting up the feminist section of the store. The store was originally located on Crescent Street at a time when the city's gay village was still centred on the nearby Stanley Street. The store specialized in LGBT literature, feminist literature, and non-sexist children's books, stocking titles originally in English only, and then in both English and French.

Being one of the very few places outside of bars where queer people could congregate, L'Angrogyne became a centre of cultural and political activity. Displaying posters for events, selling tickets for concerts and hosting meetings were only some of the activities undertaken especially when it became a volunteer collective operation in the coming years. Everyone including researchers came by since the collection was in many ways unparalleled.

In the spring of 1975, Bruce Garside and Will Aitken wanted to withdraw from active responsibility for keeping the store going. It was taken over by Frank Brayton and Kirk Kelly, both of whom left shortly thereafter.

By 1976 the store was entirely operated by a group of volunteers, none of whom owned it or received any compensation, particularly Mark Wilson who maintained the finances and determined the budgets. While the composition of the group was in constant flux, a core group of individuals kept it open from 1976 to 1982. In its first location, the bookstore shared space with the anarchist bookstore Black Rose until they moved in 1978.

In 1982, the store moved to a small upstairs location on Saint Laurent Boulevard. The store was acquired the following year by two of the volunteers, Lawrence Boyle and Philip Rappaport. In 1986 Boyle took sole possession of the store and the same year moved it to the larger ground floor location where it became best known. Over the next fifteen years L’Androgyne was a cornerstone of gay and lesbian literature from Quebec, Canada and around the world and was an integral part of the burgeoning queer publishing movement. In the 1980s, the store, like Glad Day Bookshop and Little Sister's Book and Art Emporium, ran into issues with Canada Customs frequently delaying or blocking shipments of books to the store.

Boyle sold the store to France Désilets in 1995; Désilets, in turn, sold the store to Bernard Rousseau, the owner of the Priape chain, in 2001, although she stayed on as the store's manager. In the same year, the store moved to its final location, on Amherst Street (now named Rue Atateken) in the relocated Gay Village. Due to the early 21st-century decline of LGBT-oriented independent bookstores across North America, however, the store closed by 2002; unlike Glad Day, which survived in this era by adding sex-related merchandise, such as gay and lesbian pornography, to its catalogue, Rousseau opted not to do so as he would mainly have been cannibalizing his own sales at Priape.

In Montreal, there is the feminist and queer bookstore, L'Euguélionne, which acknowledges Librairie Androgyne as its predecessor.
