= James Ley (dramatist) =

Scottish playwright and screenwriter

James Ley is a Scottish playwright and screenwriter based in Glasgow. He is best known for the play Love Song to Lavender Menace which premiered at Royal Lyceum Theatre, Edinburgh, in 2017. Ley's previous works include I Heart Maths for Oran Mor, SPAIN for Glasgay! and UP for The Vault, Edinburgh Festival Fringe.

== Writing career ==
Written as an LGBT History Month Scotland Cultural Commission, Ley's play Love Song to Lavender Menace explores the story of the Lavender Menace Bookshop in Edinburgh which operated between 1982 and 1987. The play was first performed at the Village Pub Theatre, Leith which presents readings of short plays and was co-founded by Ley.

In 2022, Ley's surreal romantic comedy Wilf, a play about a man who falls in love with his car, was performed at Traverse Theatre as part of their Edinburgh Festival Fringe season. Also in 2022, Ley wrote and directed Ode to Joy (How Gordon got to go to the nasty pig party) which was performed at Summerhall as part of the Made in Scotland Showcase at the Edinburgh Festival Fringe and it won a Scotsman Fringe First Award.

James Ley worked with Damian Barr to adapt Barr's memoir, Maggie & Me, for the stage in 2024.

In 2025, James Ley's short film, Sleazy Tiger, had its world premiere at Palm Springs International Film Festival ShortFest, as part of the GAYLA! programme. It stars Jay Newton, Alan Cumming, and Jack Douglas.

== Plays ==
- The Ego Plays, Oberon Books, 2011, ISBN 9781849432306
- Love Song to Lavender Menace, Oberon Books, 2017, ISBN 9781786823427
- Wilf (Traverse Theatre, 2022)
- Ode to Joy (How Gordon got to go to the nasty pig party) (Summerhall, 2022)
- Maggie & Me, Co-writer with Damian Barr (Traverse Theatre, 2024)

== Films ==
- Sleazy Tiger, Director and Screenwriter (2025)
