= Violette and Co =

Bookshop and café in Paris

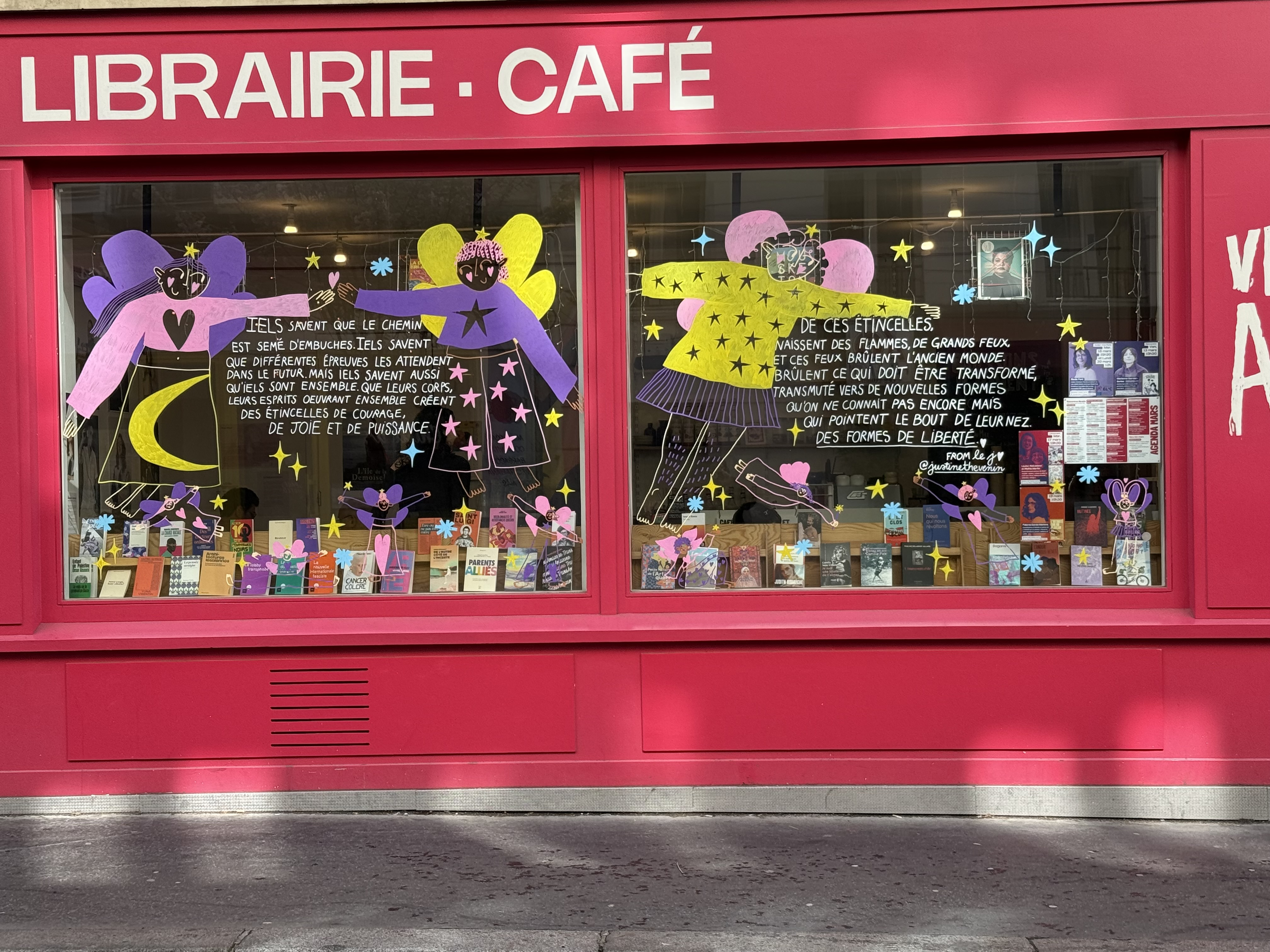
- Founded: February 2004
- Type: Lesbian and Feminist Bookshop
- Location: 52, rue Jean-Pierre-Timbaud, 75011, Paris
- Coordinates: 48°51′59″N 2°22′23″E
- Website: https://www.violetteandco.com/

Violette and Co is a lesbian, feminist, and LGBTQIA+ bookshop and café opened in 2004, located in Paris. Closed down in 2022 by its two cofounders, it was reopened in 2023 under new management with the support of a crowdfunding campaign. The new team added a café space and expanded the bookshop's collection to include children's books and comics.

The bookshop has received significant media attention since 2025 after being victim to attacks and harassment for carrying a children's colouring book deemed controversial for its discussions of the genocide in Gaza.

== History ==
=== 102 rue de Charonne ===
Founded by Catherine Florian and Christine Lemoine in February 2004, Violette and Co specialises in lesbian, feminist, and LGBTQIA+ literature. First located at 102 rue de Charonne, it would later relocate to its current address after being taken over by new management.

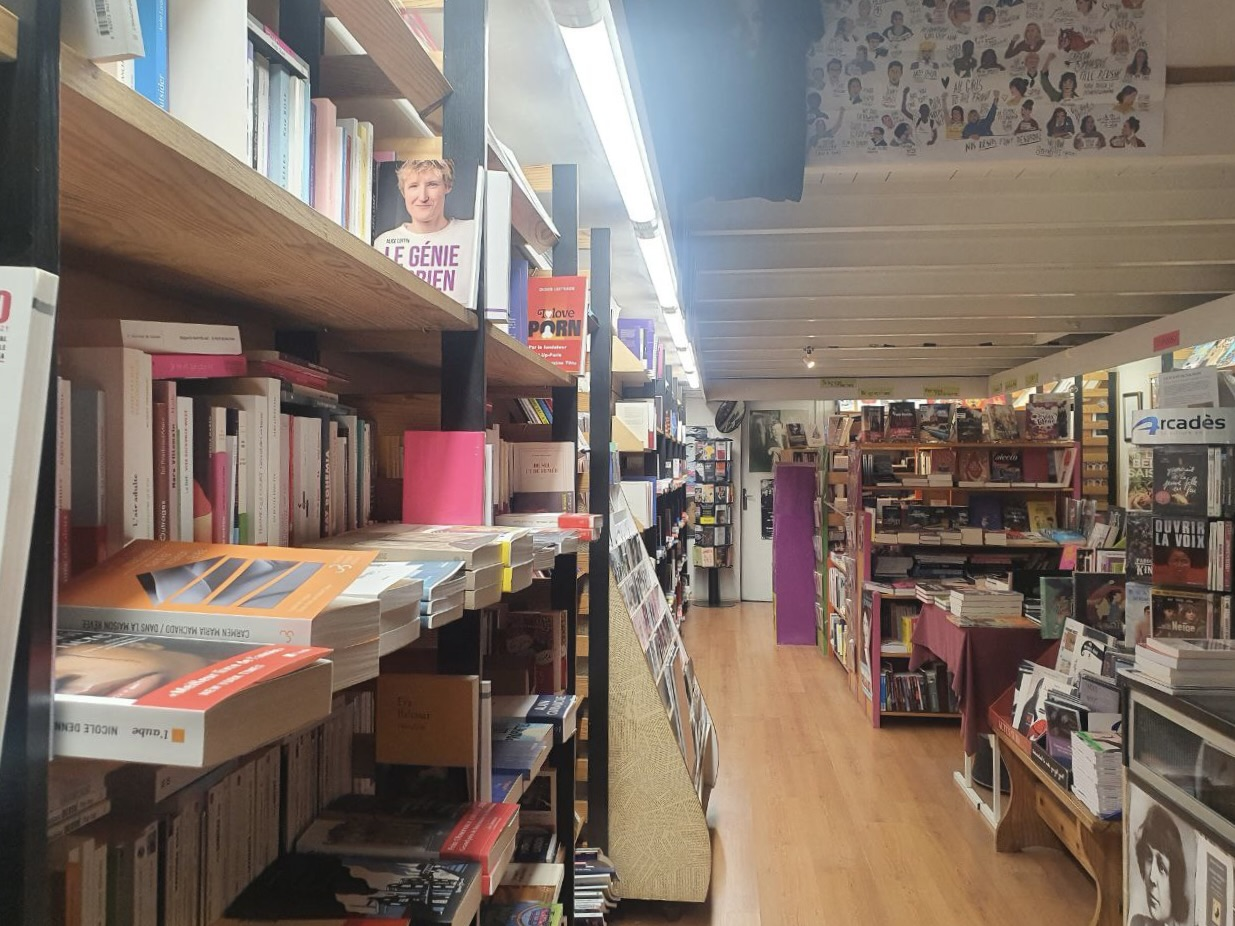
Interior of Violette and Co's original premises.

The bookshop's name pays hommage to four things: to Violette Leduc, a French lesbian writer; to the colour violet, a symbol of feminism, particularly for British suffragettes; to violets, a lesbian symbol; and finally to the Parisian bookshop Shakespeare and Company, which was founded by a lesbian.

Many prominent lesbian and feminist figures have visited the bookshop to speak, including: Alison Bechdel, Judith Butler, Virginie Despentes, Céline Sciamma, Jeannette Winterson, Teresa de Lauretis, and Sarah Schulman.

In Autumn 2019, the owners announced their plans to retire and their intention to sell the brand and the bookshop's assets. Despite receiving numerous offers, they ultimately held off on selling due to personal reasons and the landlord's decision to sell the premises. In Spring 2021, in the wake of the COVID-19 pandemic, they revisited their decision and began looking for a successor once again. In January 2022, they sold to a collective that met their criteria for familiarity with the LGBTQ+ community and expertise in running a bookshop.

=== 52 rue Jean-Pierre-Timbaud ===
==== Reopening ====
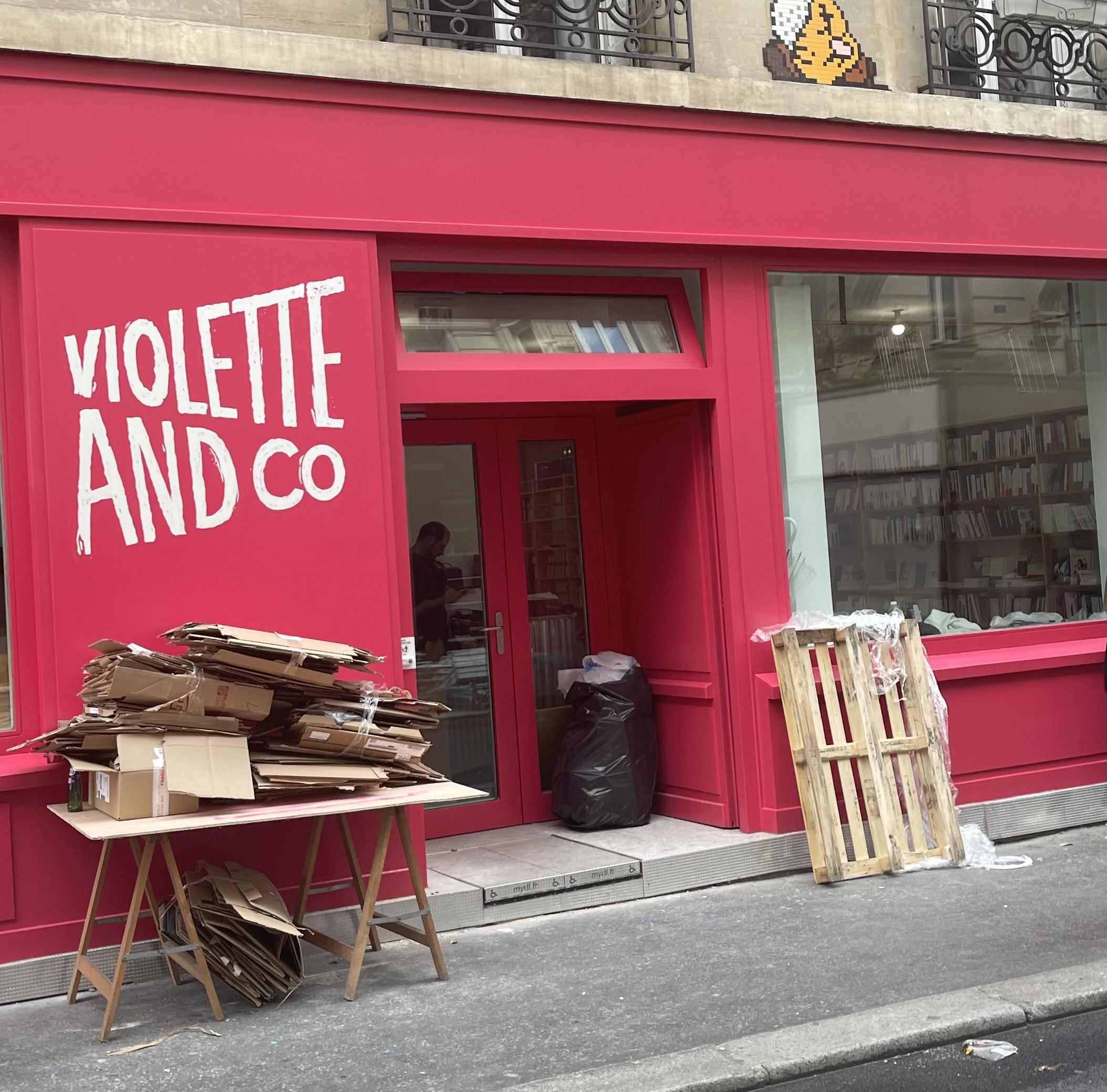
Violette and Co's new shopfront before its grand opening on 13 October 2023.

The bookshop was taken over by the Violette and Coop collective, a group of 6 people, which launched a crowdfunding campaign to raise the funds needed to take over the bookshop in March 2022. The campaign engaged with the lesbian, LGBTQIA+, and feminist communities through fundraising events, donation incentives, and the involvement of prominent community figures such as Fatima Daas and Fania Noël. During this period without a physical location, the booksellers ran booths at lesbian, LGBTQIA+, and feminist festivals.

In 2023, the new team announced that Violette and Co would reopen on Friday 13 October.

==== Controversy and harassment surrounding pro-Palestinian book ====
In the summer of 2025, the bookshop's window was vandalised with the words "Hamas rapists" and "Islamo Accomplice" written with acid, due to the bookshop's selling of a pro-Palestinian colouring book From the River to the Sea. The booksellers were also harassed and received death threats. Two elected officials of Paris, Nelly Garnier and Aurélien Véron, fueled a disinformation campaign, claiming in particular that the bookshop received subsidies from the City of Paris. The booksellers announced that they would be taking legal action.

In December 2025, the Île-de-France region denied Violette and Co a grant to make its premises accessible, due to the sale of the colouring book, with the bookshop being accused of "distributing anti-Semitic publications".

On 7 January 2026, the bookshop was raided by five police officers, accompanied by a prosecutor, in search of items prohibited from sale, namely the aforementioned colouring book. Although no copies of the book were found, the bookshop's management were summoned for questioning as part of a preliminary investigation. On 17 March, the investigation was closed without further action.

== Other activities ==
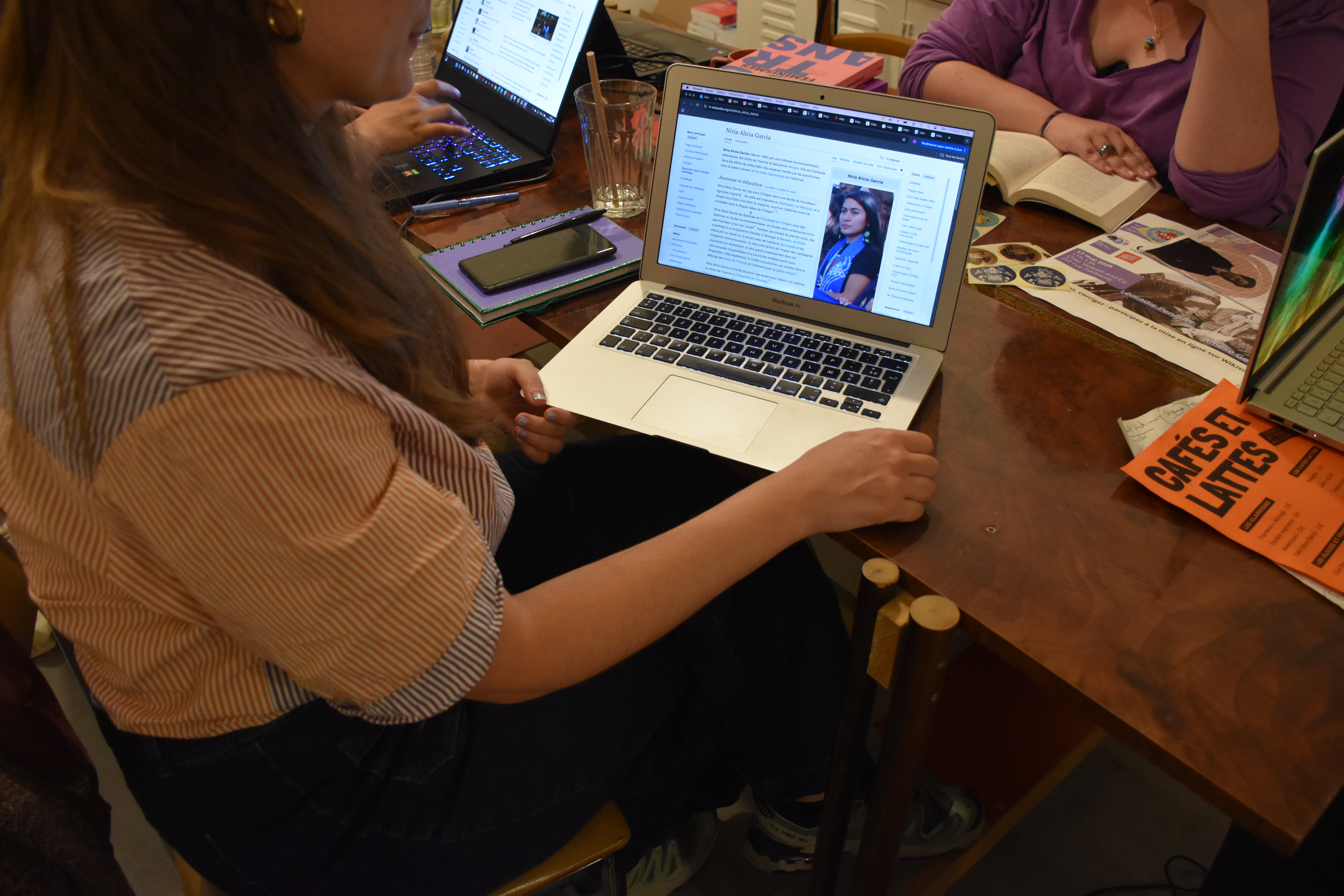
A workshop for contributing to French Wikipedia at Violette and Co in 2025, as part of the Les sans pagEs project.

Violette and Co also serves as a community space for events, including writing workshops, author meet-and-greets, and exhibitions, making it a go-to location for lesbian, trans, and feminist events. Les sans pagEs, a French-language project that aims to reduce gender bias on Wikipedia, organises contribution workshops in the bookshop.
