= Lavender Menace Bookshop =

Bookshop in Edinburgh

Coordinates: 55°57′28″N 3°11′15″W

Lavender Menace Lesbian & Gay Community Bookshop
- Company type: Bookshop
- Founded: 21 August 1982
- Founder: Sigrid Nielsen and Bob Orr
- Defunct: 1986
- Website: https://lavendermenace.org.uk/

The Lavender Menace Bookshop was an independent gay bookshop in Edinburgh from 1982 to 1986. It was the first gay bookshop in Scotland and the second in the United Kingdom.

As of 2019, the Lavender Menace now operates as the Lavender Menace Queer Books Archive. As a blog and pop-up bookshop, it preserves rare, out of print queer books and ephemera through physical and digital archiving efforts.

== History ==
=== Origins ===
The Lavender Menace Bookshop began as a bookstall called Lavender Books in the cloakroom of Fire Island gay disco on Princes Street, Edinburgh. The name of the stall was taken from the Lavender Menace radical lesbian feminist collective which was active during the 1970s. On 21 August 1982, founders Bob Orr and Sigrid Nielsen opened the Lavender Menace Bookshop in the basement of 11a Forth Street, downstairs from the offices of SCRAM ans the Smiling Sun bookshop. In the first 10 days of being open, the bookshop took nearly £1300 of sales, despite homosexual acts (between two men aged at least 21 years) having been decriminalised in Scotland only from 1 February 1980.

=== Other activities ===
As well as selling books in the shop itself, the Lavender Menace also operated a mail order service, which the magazine Gay News remarks was "particularly important for the many Scottish gays desperately isolated by geography and vestigial public transport". The shop was advertised in various LGBT magazines, such as Gay Scotland, Gay News, and Gay Times, as well as producing its own intersectional newsletter which was subtitled "non-racist, non-sexist, non-sensical". The shop also hosted groups and events, such as an open meeting for the Gay Youth Movement in 1983 and Lesbian Reader's Evenings in 1985, which attracted guests such as authors Jeanette Winterson and Suniti Namjoshi.

=== Book seizures ===
Similarly to other LGBT bookshops of the time, such as Gay's the Word in London, the Lavender Menace Bookshop lost much of its stock to book seizures by the UK government's Customs and Excise. In 1984, officers seized 26 books from the Lavender Menace shop, and a shipment of books worth £250 that were destined for an Edinburgh Festival Fringe reading was detained at Prestwick Airport. Further stock from America was impounded at the docks. The shop's founders circumvented this for a time by addressing their deliveries to Miss Marianne Woods and Miss Jane Pirie, two notable lesbians who lived in Edinburgh in the early 19th century, and sending them to private addresses. They were eventually discovered, although Nielsen noted in an interview that "I was just happy that their names should be remembered – even by customs men at the docks". In 1985, the shop instigated an effort to raise £400 towards a campaign by Gay's the Word bookshop in London to defend the shop's owners against charges related to the importing of allegedly "indecent" books which had been seized at customs.

=== West & Wilde ===
In 1987, the shop moved to Dundas Street, and the name was changed to West & Wilde, after the writers Vita Sackville-West and Oscar Wilde. Sigrid Nielsen was not officially involved in this next phase of the bookshop, which was run by Bob Orr and Raymond Rose. In 1994 a campaign by the bookshop raised funds of £10,000 to continue its work as both a bookshop and community centre. However, the bookshop closed permanently in 1997 due to financial difficulties, with Nielsen citing the stocking of LGBT books by mainstream shops and the increasing popularity of buying books over the internet. Nielsen said in an interview, "we just couldn’t afford to discount books, and, of course, Waterstones could. That undermined the idea of people coming to us first. And the internet was just beginning to take off as well."

== Legacy ==
In October 2017, the play Love Song to Lavender Menace by the Edinburgh playwright James Ley premiered at Royal Lyceum Theatre in Edinburgh. The play drew inspiration from the story of how the Lavender Menace Bookshop was founded and is set in the last few days of the shop's time at Forth Street. The success of Ley's play would help revive the Lavender Menace as The Lavender Menace LGBT+ Book Archive in 2019.

== See also ==
- List of LGBT bookstores
- OurStory Scotland
