= Index of education articles =

This is an index of education articles.

== A ==
Abstract management - Academic administration - Academic Assembly - Academic conference - Academic degree - Academic department - Academic dishonesty - Academic elitism - Academic freedom - Academic honor code - Academic institution - Academic mobility - Academic rank - Academic Ranking of World Universities - Academic regalia - Academic Research Alliance - Academic seduction - Academic senate - Academic term - Academic writing - Academician - Academy - ACTFL Proficiency Guidelines - Active learning - Activity theory - Actual development level - Adaptive Design - ADDIE Model - Adolescence - Adult education - Adult high school - Adult learner - Advanced Placement Program - Affect heuristic - Affective filter - Agoge - Agricultural education - AICC - Algorithm of Inventive Problems Solving - Algorithmic learning theory - Alma mater - Alternative assessment - Alternative education - Alternative high school - Alternative school - ALT-J - Research in Learning Technology - Alumni association - Alumnus/a - Al-Madinah International University - American Educational Research Association - Anchoring and adjustment - Andragogy - Angelman syndrome - Animated narrative vignette - Anti-bias curriculum - Anti-intellectualism - Anti-racist mathematics - Applied Behavior Analysis - Apprenticeship - Art education - Articulation (education) - Assistive technology - Asynchronous learning - Atkinson-Shiffrin theory - Attention versus memory in prefrontal cortex - Attention-deficit hyperactivity disorder - Attribution theory - Auckland University of Technology Alumni Association - Audiovisual Education - Australasian Journal of Educational Technology - Autism - Autodidacticism - Autonomous learning - Autoshaping - Availability heuristic

== B ==
Bachelor of Arts - Bachelor of Education - Bachelor of Science - Baconian method - Baddeley's model of working memory - Barron's Educational Series - Basic education - Behaviorism - Bias in education - Bilingual education - Biliteracy - Bionics - Biscuit Fire publication controversy - Blended learning - Blindness and education - Block scheduling - Board of education - Boarding school - Bobo doll experiment - Bologna declaration - Bologna process - Book flood - Book-and-Record set - Borough Road - Brainstorming - Brainwashing - Bridge program - British degree abbreviations - Bulletin board - Bullying - Business Education Initiative - C.Phil.

== C ==
California Virtual Academies - Cambridge International Examinations - Campus novel - Campus university - Career development - Career - Carnegie Classification of Institutions of Higher Education - Catholic education - Certificate of Higher Education - Chaining - Challenge Index - Chancellor (education) - Character education - Charter schools - Cheder - Chemistry education - Child - Childhood amnesia - Chunking (psychology) - Citizenship education - Civic, Social and Political Education - Class ring - Classical conditioning - Classical education - Classroom management - CliffsNotes - Co-counselling - Coeducation - Cognitive apprenticeship - Cognitive load - Cognitive map - Cognitive tutor - Collaborative learning - College and university rankings - College rivalry - College - Commentarii - Commonwealth Scholarship - Communicative language teaching - Community college - Community High School (Ann Arbor, Michigan) - Community of practice - Community Podcast - Comprehensive school - Compulsory education - Computer assisted instruction - Computer Based Learning - Computer Supported Cooperative Learning - Computer-adaptive test - Computer-based training - Concept map - Conceptual blending - Confabulation - Congregation (university) - Connectionism - Connexions - Constructive criticism - Constructivism (learning theory) - Continuing education - Coolhunting - Cooperative education - Cooperative learning - Core curriculum - Corporal punishment - Council for the Indian School Certificate Examinations - Course (education) - course atlas - Creative Education Foundation - Creative industries - Creative problem solving - Creative services - Creative Services Firms - Creativity - Creativity techniques - Criterion-referenced test - Critical pedagogy - Critical thinking - Cronbach's alpha - Cross-registration - Cue-dependent forgetting - Culfest - Cultural learning - Culturally relevant teaching - Curriculum - Curriculum-based measurement

== D ==
Dalton Plan - Dead white males - Dean (education) - Decay theory - Declarative learning - Declarative memory - Democratic school - Demyship - UK Department for Education and Skills - Deschooling - Deweyism - Dilemma - Diploma of Education - Diploma of Higher Education - Diploma - Direct instruction - Disability - Distance education - DISTAR - Doctor of Canon Law - Driving simulator - Dry campus - Dsamun - Dual education system - Dual-coding theory - Duck test - Dumbing down - Dunce - Dynamic assessment - Dyslexia

== E ==
Early Childhood Education Act - Early childhood education - Early college entrance program - Early literacy - Edline - Education International - Education of girls and women - Education Policy Analysis Archives - Education policy - Education reform - Education voucher - Education - Educational animation - Educational assessment - Educational counseling - Educational evaluation - Educational existentialism - Educational leadership - Educational music - Educational perennialism - Educational progressivism - Educational psychology - Educational reform in occupied Japan - Educational research - Educational Technology & Society - Educational technology - Edusat - Edutainment - Effect size - Eidetic memory - E-learning - Electronic portfolio - Elkonin boxes - E-mentoring - Emergent algorithm - Employment counsellor - Encaenia - English village - Environmental education - Episodic memory - Erhard Seminars Training - Eromenos - Esalen Institute - Ethics - Eurisko - Eurythmy - Evolutionary educational psychology - Executive Education - Exhibitioner - Exosomatic memory - Experiential education - Experimental analysis of behavior - Expulsion (academia) - Extinction (psychology) - Extracurricular Activity

== F ==
Factor analysis - Factorial experiment - Faculty (division) - Faculty (teaching staff) - False memory - Fartlek - Fast mapping - Fear conditioning - Fellow - Filmstrip - Finishing school - Flashbulb memory - Flashcard - Flow (psychology) - Forbidden knowledge - Force field analysis - Forensics - Forgetting - Forgetting curve - For-Profit Education - Four stages of competence - Framework for Intervention - Free education - Free school meals - French immersion - Froebel Gifts - Frosh - Functional illiteracy - Further education - Future Problem Solving Program

== G ==
Gap Year - Gateway to Higher Education (program) - GED - General education requirements - General intelligence factor - General National Vocational Qualification - Getting Things Done - G. I. American Universities - Gifted education - Gifted - Globalization - Goal Theory - Grading in education - Graduate Diploma - Graduate school - Graduation - Graphic organizers - Grounded theory (Glaser) - Grounded theory (Strauss)

== H ==
Habituation - Halo effect - Harkness table - Hawthorne effect - Head boy - Head Start Program - Head teacher - High school - High/Scope - Higher Certificate - Higher Diploma - Higher education - Higher National Certificate - Higher National Diploma - Highly sensitive person - Hipster PDA - History and philosophy of science - History of education in Japan - HM (patient) - Holland Codes - Homeschooling - Honorary title (academic) - Honors student - Hooked on Phonics - Hospitality management - How to Read a Book - How to Solve It - Human Performance Technology - Human Potential Movement - Humanistic education - Human rights education

== I ==
Iconic memory - Imitation - Imperial examination - Imprinting (psychology) - Inclusive classroom - Incremental reading - Independent scholar - Independent school - Individualized instruction - Infant Education - INFOCOMP Journal of Computer Science - Information design - Information mapping - Innate behaviour - Inquiry education - Institutional pedagogy - Instructional capital - Instructional design - Instructional scaffolding - Instructional technology - Instructional theory - Integrative learning - Intellectual - Intelligence (trait) - Interdisciplinary teaching - Interference theory - International Democratic Education Conference - International Journal of Educational Technology - Science Olympiad, International - Internet tutorial - Intertwingularity - Intrinsic motivation - Ipsative - Item response theory - Ivy League

== J ==
JANET - Jewish quota - Jigsaw Classroom - Joint Association of Classical Teachers - Joint Committee on Standards for Educational Evaluation - JUD - Juku

== K ==
K-12 - K-5 (education) - Karzer - Kentucky Education Reform Act - Kindergarten - Kinesthetic learning - Knowledge building - Knowledge cafe - Knowledge is Power - Knowledge management - Knowledge transfer - Knowledge visualization - Knowledge - Kohlberg's stages of moral development - Kurso de Esperanto

== L ==
Landmark Education - Language education - Language policy - Latchkey child - Lateral thinking - Latin honors - Law of effect - Laws of Technical Systems Evolution - League Tables of British Universities - Learned helplessness - Learner autonomy - Learning by teaching - Learning cycle - Learning disability - Learning sciences - Learning styles - Learning theory (education) - Learning theory - Learning - Lecture - Lecturer - Legal education - Legality of homeschooling in the United States - Legitimate peripheral participation - Lesson plan - Lesson - Level of Invention - Liberal arts - Lies My Teacher Told Me - Lie-to-children - Life coaching - Life skills - Lifelong learning - Lifespring - Likert scale - Linkword - Lisbon recognition convention - List of academic disciplines - List of colleges and universities by country - Colleges and universities by country, list of - Universities and colleges by country, list of - List of fields of doctoral studies - List of Friends Schools - List of Phonics Programs - List of publications in psychology - List of schools by country - List of Sudbury schools - List of Upper Canada College alumni - Literacy - LogoVisual thinking (LVT) - Longitudinal data system - Long-term memory - Losada Zone - Lyceum movement

== M ==
Machine learning - Maieutics - Marketing of schools - Maslow's hierarchy of needs - Mass education - Mastery learning - Math education - Mathetics - Matriculation - Maturationism - Mature student - Medical education - Medieval university (Asia) - Medieval university - Medium of instruction - Memory consolidation - Memory - Mental management - Mentor - Mentoring - Meta learning - Meta-analysis - Metacognition - Mickey Mouse degrees - Microcosmographia Academica - Microelectronics Education Programme - Middle School - Military academy - Mind map - M-learning - Mnemonic - Molecular mechanisms of memory - Money illusion - Monitorial system - Montessori method - Moral reasoning - Morphological analysis - Motivation - Moulage - Mozart effect - Music education

== N ==
National Coalition of Alternative Community Schools - National Diploma - National Vocational Qualification - Nature study - NEPAD e-school programme - Network of practice - Networked learning - New Games Book - No Child Left Behind Act - Nobel Conference - Non-traditional students - Normal school - Norm-referenced test - Northfield School of Arts and Technology - Notetaking - Numeracy - Numerus clausus - Nurse education - Nursing school - Nurture

== O ==
Obscurantism - Observational learning - Occam's Razor - Of Education - One-room school - Online education - Online learning - Online training - Open classroom - Open education - Open Peer Commentary - Operant conditioning - Optics - Optout - Ordinary National Certificate - Organizational learning - Outcome-based education - Outdoor education - Out of school learning - Overjustification effect - Overlearning

== P ==
Pair by association - Parallel education - Parallel tempering - Parents' Rights Coalition - Parent-Teacher Association - Parentocracy - Parsimony - Passive review - Pastoral care - Peabody Education Fund - Peace education - Peak–end rule - Pedagogical patterns - Pedagogy - Pedology (children study) - Peer pressure - Peer support - Perpetual Education Fund - Personal and social education - Personal budget - Personal development - Philosophy of education - Phonics - Phonological awareness - Photovoice - Phrase completions - Physical education - Picture superiority effect - Picture thinking - Piled Higher and Deeper - PISA (student assessment) - Pit school - Popular education - Postdoctoral researcher - Postgraduate Diploma - Postgraduate education - Post-secondary education - Praxis test - Predictive validity - Premack principle - Preparatory school - Preschool education - Primary education - Principal (university) - Principle of least astonishment - Prison education - Privatdozent - Private school - Proactive interference - Problem finding - Problem solving - Problem-based learning - Problem-based learning - Procedural memory - Professional degree - Professionalism - Professor - Program evaluation - Programmed instruction - Project-based learning - Propositional knowledge - Prospective memory - Pro-Vice-Chancellor - Provost (education) - Psychology of learning - Psychometrics - Public education - Public lecture - Public school (UK) - Public school (government funded) - Punishment - Pushout - Pygmalion effect

== Q ==
Quadrivium - Qualitative psychological research - Quantitative psychological research - Quaternary education

== R ==
Radical Teacher - Rasch model - Reactive search - Reader (academic rank) - Reading (activity) - Reading Comprehension - Reading disability - Reading education - Reading Recovery - Reasoner - Reasoning - Recitation - Recognition heuristic - Recollection - Recreational reading - Reggio Emilia approach - Reinforcement hierarchy - Reinforcement - Reliability (statistics) - Religious education - Representative heuristic - Repressed memory - Rescorla-Wagner model - Research assistant - Research Associate - Research I university - Resident Honors Program - Response to intervention - Retroactive interference - Roof and tunnel hacking - Ropes course - Rote learning - Rubric (academic) - Rubrics (education) - Running record

== S ==
- Sail training - Salutatorian - Satisficing - Scholar - Scholarly method - Scholarship - School accreditation - School and university in literature - School choice - School discipline - School holiday - School principal - School psychologist - School refusal - School uniform - School - Science education - Scientific classification - Scientific consensus - Scientific enterprise - SCORM - Scottish Vocational Qualification - Second language acquisition - Secondary education - Second-order conditioning - Self-concept - Self-criticism - Self-Determination Theory - Self-efficacy - Self-help - Self-regulated learning - Semantic memory - Seminar - Senior project - Sensory memory - Service learning - Sex education - Shaping (psychology) - Sheffield Scientific School - Short-term memory - Similarity heuristic - Simulated annealing - Simulation heuristic - Single-sex education - Situated cognition - Situated learning - Slater Fund - Sleep-learning - Slöjd - Social cognitive theory of morality - Social cognitive theory - Social promotion - Social studies - Socialization - Socratic method - Spaced repetition - Spatial memory - Special education - Specialist degree - Testing, standardised; public policy - Standardized testing - STEM fields - Stipend - Student activism - Student engagement - Student loan - Student voice - Student - Student-centred learning - Studium Generale - Subvocalization - Sudbury school - Sudbury Valley School - Summer Learning Loss - Summerbridge - Summerhill School - Sustained silent reading - Suzuki method - SWCHA - Syllabus - Symposium

== T ==
Take-the-best heuristic - Taking Children Seriously - Tamariki - Taxonomy of Educational Objectives - Teacher in role - Teachers College - Teaching credential - Teaching in-Role - Teaching method - Teaching - Teach First - Teaching philosophy - Technology education - Technology Integration - Telesecundaria - Tele-TASK - Teletraining - Tens System - Tenure - Tertiary education - TET - Textbook - The 2005 Global Intellectuals Poll - The Circle School - The Cruelty of Really Teaching Computer Science - The Dalton School - The Evolution of Education Museum - The Hershey Montessori Farm School - The Hidden Curriculum - The Magical Number Seven, Plus or Minus Two - The Princeton Review - The Seven Habits of Highly Effective People - The Teaching Company - Theory of cognitive development - Theory of multiple intelligences - Thesis - Time management - Town and gown - Training manual - Training - Transfer of learning - Transformational learning - Transformative learning - Très honorable avec félicitations - Trial and error - Trial-and-error method - Triangle Program - Triarchic theory of intelligence - Trivium - TRIZ - Truancy - Tuition

== U ==
Umbrella school - Undergraduate - Understanding - Underwater basket weaving - United States Academic Decathlon - United States Department of Education - Universal Design for Learning - Universal preschool - University constituency - University Interscholastic League - University of Auckland Society - University President - University - Unschooling - Upward Bound High School - Usability testing

== V ==
Valedictorian - Validity (statistics) - Vertical thinking - Vice-Chancellor - Videobook - Virtual learning environment - Vision Forum - Vision span - Visual learning - Visual memory - Visual short term memory - Vocational education - Vocational school - Volksschule

== W ==
- Waldorf education - Washington Homeschool Organization - Web literacy - Web-based training - Webinar - WebQuest - Whole language - Winnetka Plan - Wisdom - Woodcraft - Working backward from the goal - Working memory - World Innovation Summit for Education - Writing Associate - Writing Center - Writing process

== X ==
XF (grade)

== Y ==
- Year 1 - Year-round school - YGLP - Youth development - Youth empowerment - Youth mentoring - Youth voice

== Z ==
Zeigarnik effect

== See also ==
- Glossary of education-related terms
- List of academic disciplines
- List of education articles by country
