= Diploma (disambiguation) =

A diploma is a document awarded by an educational institution.

Diploma may also refer to:

Types of diploma

- Graduate diploma, a qualification taken after a first degree
- IB Diploma Programme
- Diploma in Engineering
- Postgraduate diploma
- Diploma in Nursing
- High school diploma
- National Diploma (disambiguation)
- Higher diploma
- Diploma of Journalism
- Diploma in Computer Science

Other uses

- Anglo-Saxon charter
- Diploma mill
- Diploma plc
