= Cecily O'Neill =

Cecily O’Neill is an international authority on process drama and the arts in education. She works with students, teachers, playwrights, directors, and actors throughout the world, leading drama workshops, speaking at conferences, and carrying out research. She has been an Associate Artist with the Unicorn Theatre and a visiting lecturer and examiner at several universities in the United Kingdom, the United States, and Australia. She is Resident Dramaturg for New York University's annual series 'Plays for Young Audiences, held at the historic Provincetown Playhouse in Greenwich Village. In 2013, Cecily O'Neill founded 2TimeTheatre, a performance and publishing company.

Dr. O'Neill is Associate Professor Emeritus at The Ohio State University. She was awarded an Honorary Fellowship from the University of Winchester in 2013. She is the author and editor of several books on drama including Drama Worlds, Worlds into Words: Learning a Second Language through Process Drama, Dorothy Heathcote: Collected Writings on Education and Drama, Drama Structures, and Drama Guidelines. She is Series Editor for HarperCollins’ series, Plays Plus, Classics Plus, and Short Plays Plus.

O'Neill is the artistic director of production and publishing company 2TimeTheatre. She has adapted Shakespeare's poem, Venus and Adonis, for the stage and it was first performed at the Winchester Festival in 2016. Subsequent adaptions of Jane Austen's Juvenilia, Young Jane and Meeting Miss Austen, were published in 2016 and 2017. She has also adapted Dorothy Parker's writings and short stories into a one-act comic play called Drinking with Dorothy.
