= Commercial art =

Art created for commercial purposes, primarily advertising

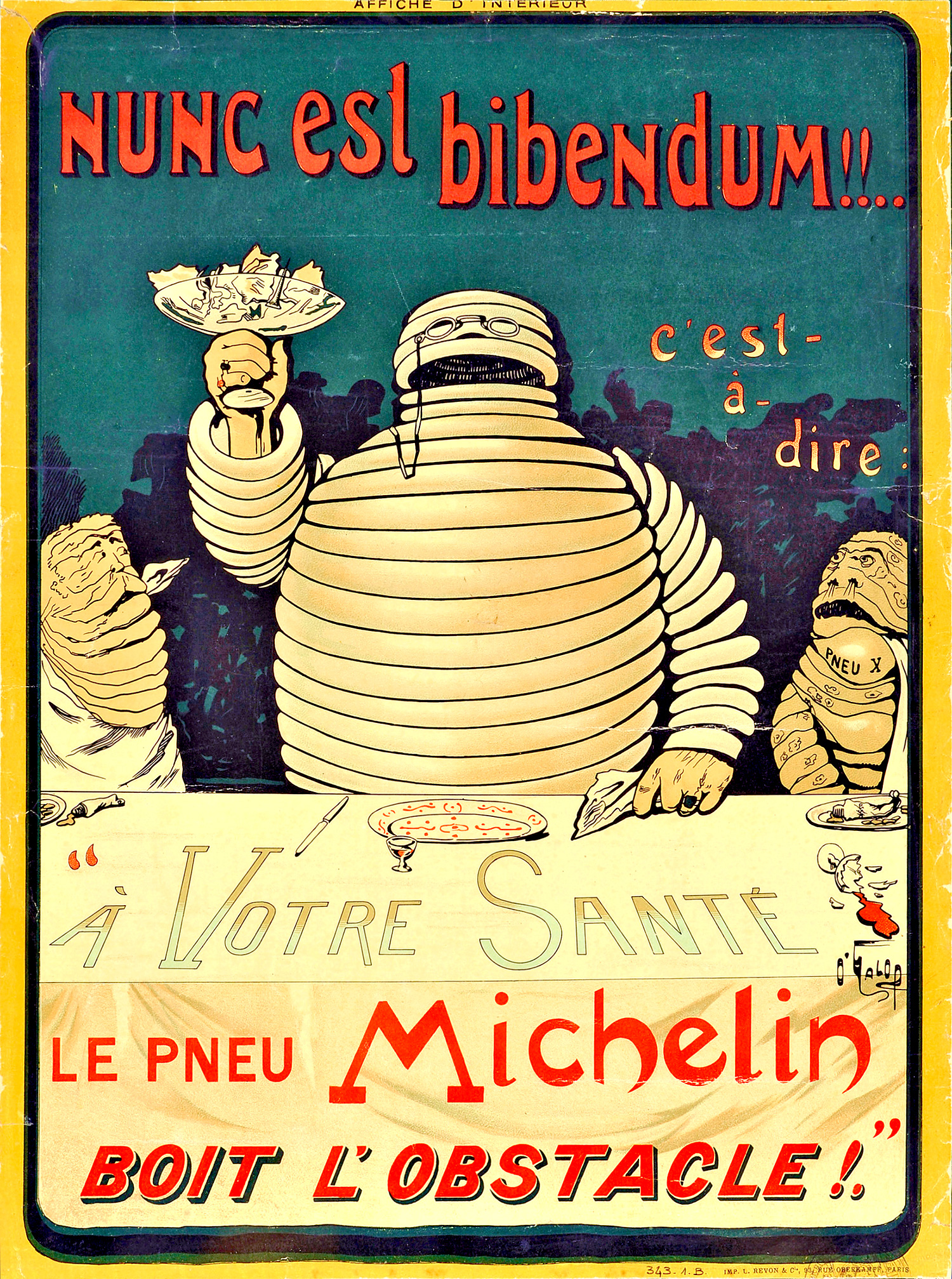
A poster by "O'Galop" of Bibendum, the Michelin Man, produced in 1898

Commercial art is the art of creative services, referring to art created for commercial purposes, primarily advertising. Commercial art uses a variety of platforms (magazines, websites, apps, television, etc.) for viewers with the intent of promoting the sale and interest of products, services, and ideas. It relies on the iconic image (pictorial representations that are recognized easily to members of a culture) to enhance recall and favorable recognition for a product or service. An example of a product could be a magazine ad promoting a new soda through complementary colors, a catchy message, and appealing illustrative features. Another example could be promoting the prevention of global warming by encouraging people to walk or ride a bike instead of driving in an eye catching poster. It communicates something specific to an audience.

People can obtain training, certifications, and degrees that incorporate commercial arts in many exercises, activities, and programs.

== History ==
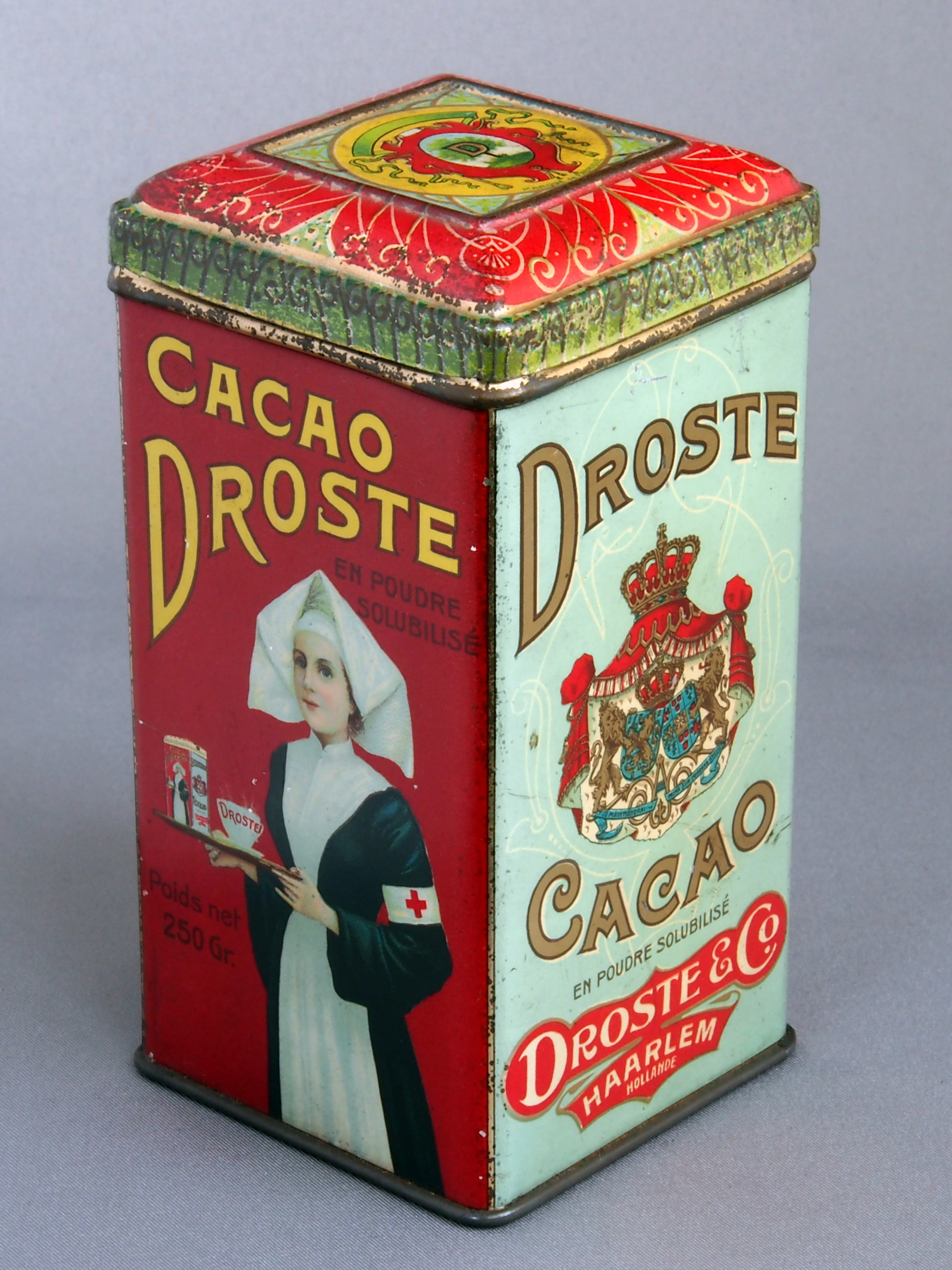
Droste cocoa packaging circa 1900

Commercial art emerged during the Industrial Revolution in the 18th century. Rapid technological improvements brought about a boom in mass production, and design for the purpose of advertising and selling this mass amount of product became a thriving industry. Designers created with the intention of capturing consumers' attention, and achieved this through large letters and a variety in fonts all printed in highly contrasting colors.

As technologies continued to advance, chromolithography became a useful tool for designers creating commercial art. Advertisements transformed from text-only designs to highly detailed, colorful illustrations. These illustrative advertisements were popular among travelling circuses, carnivals, and theatrical shows. The addition of color also revolutionized branding and labels and attention-grabbing packaging became a large sector of commercial art.

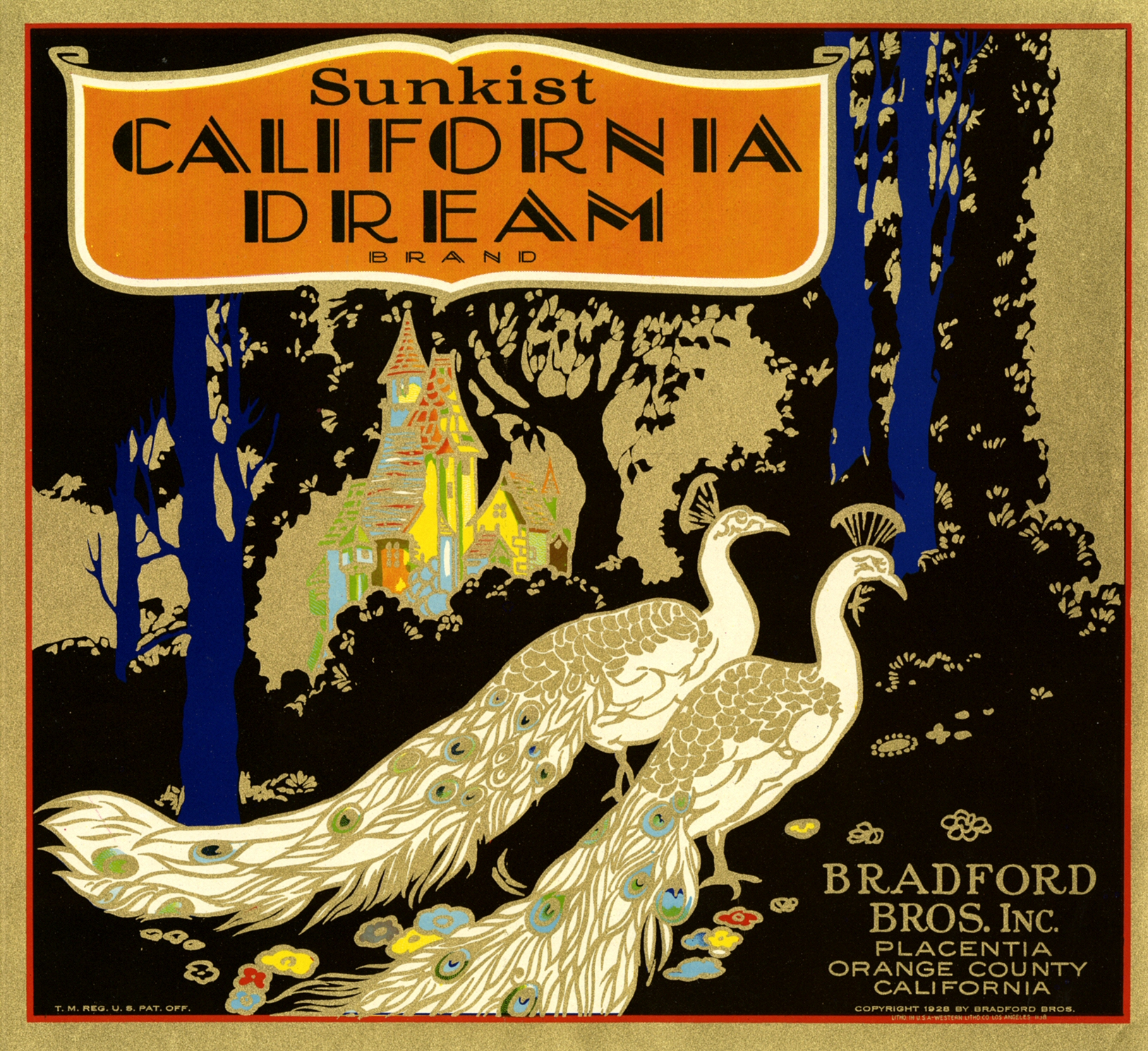
Orange crate label circa 1928, Sunkist Growers, Incorporated

== Skills ==
Commercial artists have the ability to organize information and knowledge of fine arts, visualization and media in a way to reach an audience's attention. Some of these skills may include the following:

- Attention to detail
- Ability to communicate effectively
- Experience or skills in the fine arts (drawing, painting, photography, etc.)
- Knowledgeable of certain computer software programs (graphics, editing, etc.) and ability to use them
- Marketing skills
- Advertising skills
- Coordination skills
- Animation skills

== Genres ==
Commercial art can include many genres of art and categories of art technique, including:

- Illustration
- Graphic design
- Industrial design
- Motion graphic design
- Photography
- Television commercials
- Music videos
- Animation
- Computer art
- Fashion designer
- Store art
- Decorative
- Ornamental

== Consumerism within commercial art ==
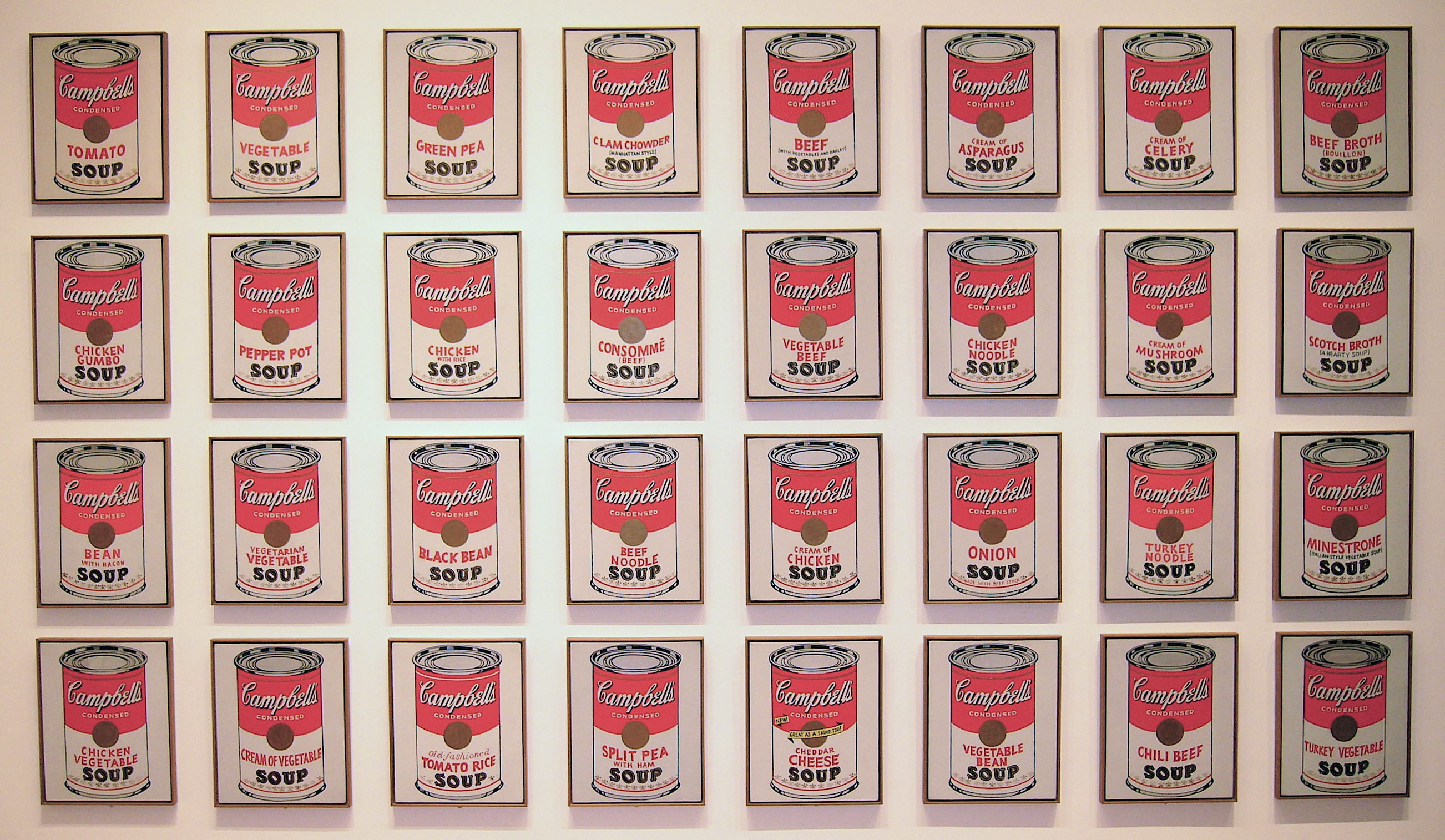
Campbell's Soup Cans painted by Andy Warhol in 1961 or 1962

Commercial art is art that is created for commercial purposes to promote services or products to viewers. In the process of creating commercial art, an audience is taken into consideration when designing and/or forming the goods that are being advertised/promoted. An example of this can be seen in the recognized works of American painter and consumer ad designer, Andy Warhol. Using Campbell's soup and Coca-Cola bottles as everyday products of consumers, he recreated a visually stimulating design through pop art that advertises the products through consumption habits of consumers. Consumerism was present when pop art was popular. Pop art could contain mass cultural objects and/or celebrities (popular culture and mass media) to endorse markets and goods.
