= Dental fear =

- Other names: Dental anxiety, dental phobia, odontophobia
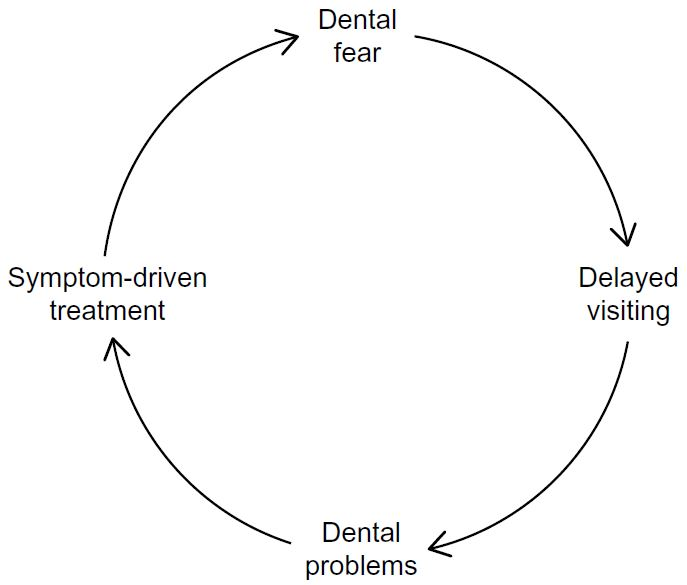
- Cycle of dental fear

Dental fear, odontophobia, or dentophobia, is a normal emotional reaction to one or more specific threatening stimuli in the dental situation. However, dental anxiety is indicative of a state of apprehension that something dreadful is going to happen in relation to dental treatment, and it is usually coupled with a sense of losing control. Dental anxiety can develop not only from previous negative dental experiences but also from fear of the unknown, fear of losing control, and discomfort with depending on an unfamiliar person during dental treatment. Similarly, dental phobia denotes a severe type of dental anxiety, and is characterized by marked and persistent anxiety in relation to either clearly discernible situations or objects (e.g. drilling, local anesthetic injections) or to the dental setting in general. Other reasons for dental anxiety include not receiving an explanation of the procedure a lack of communication is one of the biggest reasons people may experience dental fear .The term 'dental fear and anxiety' (DFA) is often used to refer to strong negative feelings associated with dental treatment among children, adolescents and adults, and even later on whether or not the criteria for a diagnosis of dental phobia are met. Dental phobia can include fear of dental procedures, dental environment or setting, fear of dental instruments or fear of the dentist as a person. People with dental phobia often avoid the dentist and neglect oral health, which may lead to painful dental problems and ultimately force a visit to the dentist. The emergency nature of this appointment may serve to worsen the phobia. This phenomenon may also be called the cycle of dental fear. Dental anxiety typically starts in childhood. There is the potential for this to place strains on relationships and negatively impact on employment.

Dental fear, anxiety, and phobia seem to be interchangeably used, however, there is a fundamental difference between each.

Dental anxiety Dental anxiety can be caused by many reasons . One of the biggest triggers is lack of control and simply the fear of not knowing what is coming . Dental anxiety can also trigger the autonomic nervous system , leading to physical symptoms such as increased blood pressure , elevated heart rate,and increased respiratory rate . These symptoms occur because the stress associated with visiting the dental office activates the body's natural protective response .

Dental fear is a response to past negative experiences that triggers apprehension.

Dental phobia is a severe, irrational fear of dental situations leading to complete avoidance of dental care, often impacting daily functioning and health. Dental Phobia does not only occur when a person visits the dentist .It can begin at home when a person starts thinking about an upcoming dental appointment ,fearing the unknown, and imagining the worst possible outcomes . Dental phobia can also affect a person's oral health . Individuals who fear the dentist or dental environment may avoid dental visits, which can lead to untreated dental problems and worsening oral health over time

== Signs and symptoms ==
As with all types of fear and phobias, dental fear can manifest as single or combination of emotional, physiological, cognitive and behavioural symptoms.

Dental Phobia can be classified into 3 broad classes:

- Mild odontophobia: the most common also referred to as dental anxiety
- Moderate odontophobia: can be classified as dental fear
- Severe dental phobia: The most severe one which is most difficult to manage.

Emotional response

- Feeling of fear
- Feeling of anxiety
- Apprehension
- Panic

Physiological response

- Increased heart rate
- Breathlessness
- Sweating
- Nausea
- Shaking

Cognitive response

- "I don't like the feeling of this..."
- "I am choking to death"
- "I am having a heart attack"
- "I am going to die"
- "Feeling of swollen face"
- "I am not able to breathe"

Behavioural response

- Agitation
- High vigilance

== Cause ==
Research suggests that there is a complex set of factors that lead to the development and maintenance of significant dental anxiety or dental phobia, which can be grouped as genetic, behavioral and cognitive factors. In comparison to other phobias, literature on odontophobia is relatively limited.

In order to better address the patients with dental fear, it is very important to understand the causes and factors associated with them.

- Traumatic Experiences: Previous negative or painful dental experiences are primary contributors.
- Learned Behavior: Observing others' fearful reactions, particularly during childhood, can reinforce dental fear.
- Fear of Pain: A common underlying factor, often exacerbated by misconceptions about modern dental procedures.
- Biological Responses: Increased cortisol levels and heightened autonomic nervous system activity have been observed in anxious dental patients.

Several theories have been proposed; however, a 2014 review describes five pathways which relate specifically to development dental fear and anxiety: Cognitive Conditioning, Vicarious, Verbal Threat, Informative, and Parental. However, there may be a variety of background factors common to all general fear and anxiety conditions that may be at play and affect these more specific pathways.

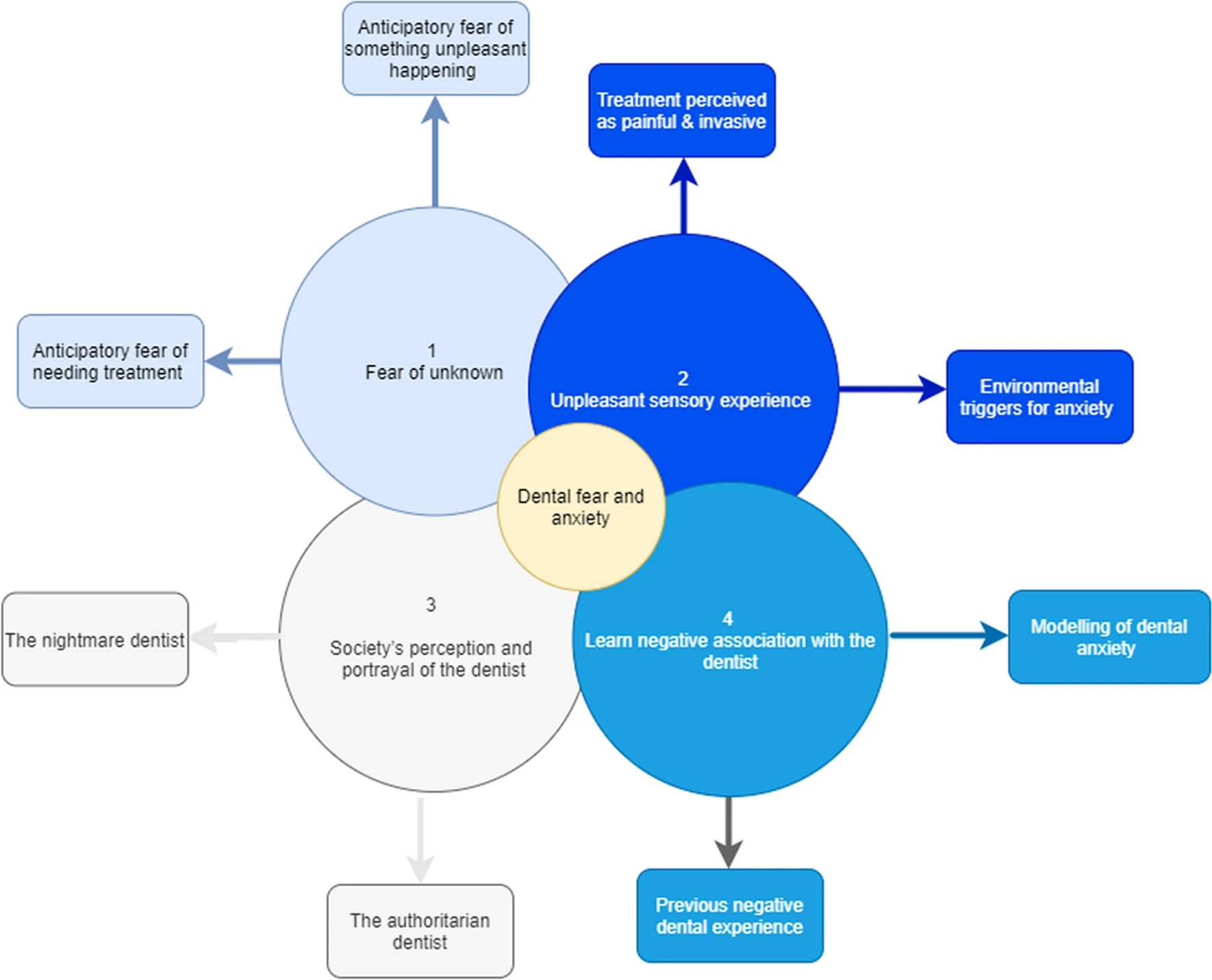
Key themes and sub-themes identified through process drama with children aged 7-10

Research utilising process drama with children aged 7-10 has identified four overarching concepts; fear of the unknown, unpleasant sensory experience, society’s portrayal of dentists and learnt negative associations with going to the dentist.

=== Conditioning ===
Conditioning is defined as the process by which a person learns through personal experience that an event or stimulus will result in a detrimental outcome, e.g. "if I visit the dentist, it is going to be sore." As, expected dental fear is associated with previous traumatic experiences, especially their first one. It is believed to be the most commonly used pathway for patients to develop dental fear and anxiety.

=== Informative ===
This indirect pathway relates to fear acquisition through gaining information and becoming bias to the dental environment from dental phobic elders, negative connotations advertised by media (e.g. television, movies), and friends with personal negative experiences.

=== Vicarious ===
The vicarious pathway suggests that fear is acquired through imagination of the feelings, experience or actions of another person. Whether this pathway occurs on its own or in combination with others is still unknown. It has been suggested that dental fear in the very young is passed through this pathway through observation of expressions of fear by elders/parents at the dentist.

=== Verbal threat ===
This pathway can be seen as similar to the informative pathway, however it is more reliant on the emotion of fear elicited by "word of mouth" and is heavily modulated by the messenger. In essence the verbal threat pathway is the fear induced when an authority figure threatens an individual with a painful experience. In the case of dental fear, the painful and/or negative experiences linked to dental visits. Although at a glance, the verbal threat and informative pathway are similar, in odontophobia the two pathways differ in that the verbal threat pathway occurs when a "visit to the dentist" is literally used as a form of punishment for bad behaviour. This does not occur in the informative pathway.

=== Parental modelling ===
There is a significant relationship between child and parental dental fear, especially that of the mothers. it has been suggested that this relationship is strongest in children 8 years or younger. However, the parental modelling pathway may overlap with the informative or vicarious pathways are all linked in some way.

== Diagnosis ==
Several methods have been developed to diagnose dental fear and anxiety. In addition to identifying the patients with dental fear, different categories of dental fear have been established. These include:

- Dental fear survey (DFS) which incapsulates 20 items in relation to various situations, feelings and reaction to dental work which is used to diagnose dental fear.
- Modified child dental anxiety scale (MCDAS), used for children and it has 8 items with a voting system from 1–5 where 1 is not worried and 5 is very worried.
- The index of dental anxiety and fear (IDAF-4C+), used for adults and it is separated into 8 item module and then a further 10 item module.
- Dental Anxiety Scale designed by Norman Corah et al: This test is considered best in terms of reliability and consistency. The scale consist of 1–4 questions and then 1–26 question. This scale has a ranking system and the second section with 26 questions has 1–4 options ranging from 'low' to 'don't know' which is used to assess dental concern. The first section with 1–4 questions has 5 Likert scale options which are worth 1–5 points with the possible number of maximum points is 20. Then depending on the result you rate the dental anxiety. 9–12 being moderate 13–14 being high, and 15–20 being severe.
- Spielberger State Trait Anxiety Index (STA): an instrument for measuring anxiety in adults. It differentiates between temporary condition of "state anxiety" and the more general and long-lasting quality of "trait anxiety". It can also help differentiate between anxiety and depression
- Anxiety Sensitivity Index (ASI): a 16-item scale that focuses on apprehension about the symptoms of anxiety itself
- Seattle System: consists of four diagnostic types in which such individuals are categorised according to the main source of their fear regarding dental treatment
  - Type 1: simple conditioned phobia—fear of dental procedures
  - Type 2: fear of catastrophe—anxiety about somatic reactions during dental treatment, e.g. fainting, panic attack, heart attack
  - Type 3: Generalized anxiety—nervous person in general
  - Type 4: distrust of dentists—fear of the dentist

== General health impacts caused by Dental phobia ==
The presence of dental phobia can have major impacts on overall health, wellbeing, and quality of one's life, in addition to directly impacting their dental health.

- Gum and periodontal diseases have been linked to heart problems.
- Broken teeth lead to chewing issues which can cause digestive disorders and malnutrition.
- Missing teeth affect speech and self-esteem.
- Not getting routine dental cleaning can lead to bad breath.

== Management ==
Dental fear varies across a continuum, from very mild fear to severe. Therefore, in a dental setting, it is also the case where the technique and management that works for one patient might not work for another. Some individuals may require a tailored management and treatment approach.

The management of people with dental fear can be done using shorter term methods such as hypnosis and general anesthetic, or longer term methods such as cognitive behavioral therapy and the development of coping skills. Short term methods have been proven to be ineffective for long-term treatment of the phobia, since many return to a pattern of treatment avoidance afterwards. Psychological approaches are more effective at maintaining regular dental care, but demand more knowledge from the dentist and motivation from the patient

Similarly, distraction techniques can also be utilized to divert the patient's attention to allow them to avoid supposed negativity and be more comfortable. This can be achieved through television or movies, or a physical distraction such as focusing on another body part such as wiggling the toes or fingers.

More recent research indicates that the use of conscious sedation combined appropriate communication techniques may relieve the anxiety in the long-term.

=== Psychocognitive ===
==== Modelling ====
Modelling is a form of psycho-behavioural therapy used to alleviate dental fear. Commonly used in paediatric dentistry, it involves the showing of a procedure under a simulated environment. It allows the patient to observe the behaviour of a friend, family member, or other patient when put in a similar situation, therefore, accommodating for the learning of new coping mechanisms. Modelling can be presented live using a parent or actor as well as virtually through pre-recorded films.

==== Tell-show-do ====
Tell-show-do is a common non-pharmacological practice used to manage behaviour such as dental fear, especially in paediatric dentistry. The purpose of this intervention is to promote a positive attitude towards dentistry and to build a relationship with the patient to improve compliance. The patient is gradually introduced to the treatment. Firstly, the dentist "tells" the patient what the dental procedure will be using words. In 'show' phase, the patient is familiarized with dental treatment using demonstrations. Lastly, in 'do' phase, the dentist proceeds with the treatment following the same procedure and demonstrations illustrated to the patient.

==== Behavioral techniques ====
A technique known as behavioral control involves the person giving a signal to the clinician when to stop the procedure. This could be simply raising a hand to let the clinician know, however, the signal that is chosen will be discussed prior. This technique provides the people with a sense of control over the appointment and as so, instills trust in the dentist.

==== Cognitive behavioral therapy ====
Cognitive behavioral therapy (CBT) appears to decrease dental fear and improve the frequency people go to the dentist. CBT for dental anxiety is often performed by psychologists, but the effect has proven to be good also when administered by trained dentists. Other measures that may be useful include distraction, guided imagery, relaxation techniques, and music therapy. Behavior techniques are believed to be sufficient for the majority of people with mild anxiety. The quality of the evidence to support this, however, is low.

==== Environment changes ====
It has been suggested that the ambience created by the dental practice can play a significant role in initiating dental fear and anxiety by triggering sensory stimuli. It has been suggested that the front of house staff, e.g. receptionist and dental nurses contribute to elicit a better cognitive and emotional experience for anxious patients by showing a positive and caring attitude and by adopting good communication techniques. For patients whose dental avoidance is related to their experiences of assault and trauma, being guided by the patients' preferences, for aspects like chair positioning, may help to avoid retriggering them. Anxious patients should not be made to wait too long in waiting rooms, so that they have less time to recall and absorb negative feelings. There is some small evidence that the waiting areas with soft music playing and dimmer lights and cooler in temperature produces a more calming effect. It has also been stipulated that masking strong clinical smells like eugenol with more pleasant smells can help to reduce anxiety, however this is more likely to be effective in moderate rather than severe anxiety.

==== Hypnosis ====
Hypnosis may be useful in certain people. Hypnosis may improve a person's level of cooperation and decrease gagging.

==== Music Therapy ====
Music therapy has shown promising results as a non-invasive method for reducing dental anxiety. By using music as a therapeutic tool, patients can experience decreased stress levels and improved relaxation during dental procedures. Music can help lower cortisol levels, modulate autonomic responses, and provide a distraction from the sounds and sensations of dental work however review of RCT's show minimal to no effect of music therapy on dental phobia.

==== Virtual Reality Exposure Therapy (VRET) ====
VRET has shown to be very effective in managing different type of phobias and in recent times few studies have been done to determine its implications in Dental phobia. Gujjar et al.'s RCT showed VRET condition patients showed a significant reduction in anxiety scores.

==== Progressive muscle relaxation ====
Ideally done in a sitting position, this relaxation technique for certain muscle groups can be implemented in the waiting room. The major muscles groups include

- feet, calves, thighs, and buttocks
- hands, forearms, and biceps
- chest, stomach, and lower back; and
- head, face, throat, and shoulders

The steps according to Edmund Jacobson are as follows:

1. Gently inhale, hold and exhale, being aware of the rise and fall of the chest.
2. Slightly extend and stretch toes towards knees, hold briefly and then let go. Recognize the difference in sensation.
3. Press heels of feet into the floor, hold and let go.
4. Press knees together hold briefly before letting them drift apart. Be aware of the change.
5. Squeeze buttocks together, hold before letting go.
6. Pull in stomach muscles towards the spine, hold briefly before releasing. Feel the difference.
7. Gently pull shoulders towards ears, enough to feel some tension in them, hold briefly before letting go.
8. Press upper arms and elbows into sides of the body, hold and then let go. Recognize a difference in feeling.
9. Gently clench hands, hold and let go.
10. Extend head forward slightly, hold briefly before releasing the tension and allowing for the head to return to the resting position.
11. Press the lips together before letting go until they are barely touching. Purse lips and let go, feeling the tension being let go.
12. Push the tongue to the roof of the mouth, hold briefly before letting it drop loosely.

==== Systematic desensitisation ====
Desensitisation in dentistry refers to the gradual exposure of a new procedure to the patient in order to calm their anxiety. It is based on the principle that a patient can overcome their anxiety if they are gradually exposed to the feared stimuli, whether imagined or real, in a controlled and systematic way. Exposure to the feared stimuli or situation is recognised as a central treatment component for specific phobias.

=== Medication ===
Pharmacological techniques to manage dental fear range from conscious sedation to general anaesthesia; these are often used and work best in conjunction with behavioural (non-pharmacological) techniques.

==== Premedication ====
Premedication refers to medication given prior to initiation of dental treatment. Benzodiazepines, a class of sedative drugs, are commonly used as premedication, in the form of a tablet, to aid anxiety management before dental treatment. Benzodiazepines are however addictive and subject to abuse, therefore only the minimum number of tablets required should be prescribed. Patients may also be required to be accompanied to their dental appointment by an escort. In the UK, temazepam used to be the drug of choice however, lately, midazolam has become much more popular. In children, a recent meta-analysis comparing oral midazolam against placebo showed some improvement in co-operation in children using midazolam. One of the disadvantages of oral premedication is that it is not titratable (i.e. it is difficult to adjust the dose to control the level of sedation desired) and therefore this technique should be only be used when other titratable sedation techniques are inappropriate.

==== Conscious sedation ====
Conscious sedation refers to the use of a single or combination of drugs to help relax and reduce pain during a medical or dental procedure. There are a range of techniques and drugs that can be used; these need to be tailored to the individual need of the patient taking into account the medical history, the skill and training of the dentist/sedationist and the facilities and equipment available. Conscious sedation is traditionally considered a short-term solution for patients with dental anxiety, but recent research indicate that provided good communication techniques and the use of other adaptations throughout the treatment, the dental anxiety reduction achieved may be lasting.

==== General anaesthesia ====
General anaesthesia is rarely used in the general dental practice, but can be provided. This is usually performed in practices specifically set up to provide this level of sedation. Most often this type of sedation is reserved for the developmentally disabled and is provided by an anesthesiologist working in conjunction with a general dentist. This service, though rare, can often be found in larger cities such as Portland, Oregon.

The use of general anaesthesia to reduce the pain and anxiety associated with dental treatment should be discouraged and general anaesthesia should be undertaken only when absolutely necessary.

== Epidemiology ==
Individuals who are highly anxious about undergoing dental treatment comprise approximately one in six of the population. The study showed the dental fear was more prevalent among women than men

- Fear of medical procedures
- List of phobias
- Dental braces
- Prosthodontics
- Oral and maxillofacial surgery
- Prosthodontics
- Dental implant
