= Somatic theory =

Theory of human social behavior

Somatic theory is a theory of human social behavior based on the somatic marker hypothesis of António Damásio. The theory proposes a mechanism by which emotional processes can guide (or bias) behavior: in particular, decision-making, the attachment theory of John Bowlby, and the self-psychology of Heinz Kohut (especially as consolidated by Allan Schore).

It draws on various philosophical models: On the Genealogy of Morals of Friedrich Nietzsche, Martin Heidegger on das Man, Maurice Merleau-Ponty practiced on the lived body as a center of experience, Ludwig Wittgenstein on social practices, Michel Foucault on discipline, as well as theories of performativity emerging out of the speech act theory by J. L. Austin, in point of fact was developed by Judith Butler and Shoshana Felman. Some somatic theorists have also put into somatic theory to performance in the schools of acting, the training was developed by Konstantin Stanislavski and Bertolt Brecht.

== Theorists ==
=== Barbara Sellers-Young ===
Barbara Sellers-Young applies Damasio’s somatic-marker hypothesis to critical thinking as an embodied performance and provides a review of the theoretical literature in performance studies that supports something like Damasio’s approach:

- Howard Gardner’s theory of multiple intelligences, especially bodily-kinesthetic intelligence
- Thomas Hanna’s believe that “we cannot sense without acting and we cannot act without sensing”
- Bonnie Bainbridge Cohen's movement-pedagogy
- Konstantin Stanislavski’s acting theory that “in every physical action, unless it is purely mechanical, there is concealed some inner action, some feelings. This is how the two levels of life in a part are created, the inner and the outer. They are intertwined. A common purpose brings them together and reinforces the unbreakable bond.”

=== Douglas Robinson ===
Douglas Robinson first began developing a somatic theory of language for a keynote presentation at the 9th American Imagery Conference in Los Angeles, in October 1985. It was based on Ahkter Ahsen's theory of somatic response to images as the basis for therapeutic transformations. In contradistinction to Ahsan's model, which rejected Freud's "talking cure" on the grounds that words do not awaken somatic responses, Robinson argued that there is a very powerful somatics of language. He later incorporated this notion into The Translator's Turn (1991), drawing on the (passing) somatic theories of William James, Ludwig Wittgenstein, and Kenneth Burke in order to argue that somatic response may be "idiosomatic" (somatically idiosyncratic), but is typically "ideosomatic" (somatically ideological, or shaped and guided by society). Furthermore, the ideosomatics of language explain how language remains stable enough for communication to be possible. This work preceded the Damasio group's first scientific publication on the somatic-marker hypothesis in 1991, and Robinson did not begin to incorporate Damasio's somatic-marker hypothesis into his somatic theory until later in the 1990s.

In Translation and Taboo (1996), Robinson drew on the proto-somatic theories of Sigmund Freud, Jacques Lacan, and Gregory Bateson to explore the ways in which the ideosomatics of taboo structure (and partly sanction and conceal) the translation of sacred texts. His first book to draw on Damasio's somatic-marker hypothesis is Performative Linguistics (2003); there he draws on J. L. Austin's theory of speech acts, Jacques Derrida's theory of iterability, and Mikhail Bakhtin's theory of dialogism, to argue that performativity as an activity of the speaking body is grounded in somatic theory. He also draws on Daniel Simeoni's application of Pierre Bourdieu's theory of habitus in order to argue that his somatics of translation as developed in The Translator's Turn actually explains translation norms more fully than Gideon Toury's account in Descriptive Translation Studies and beyond (1995).

In 2005, Robinson began writing a series of books exploring somatic theory in different communicative contexts: modernist/formalist theories of estrangement (Robinson 2008), translation as ideological pressure (Robinson 2011), first-year writing (Robinson 2012), and the refugee experience, (de)colonization, and the intergenerational transmission of trauma (Robinson 2013).

In Robinson's articulation, the somatic theory has four main planks:

1. The stabilization of social constructions through somatic markers.
2. The interpersonal sharing of such stabilization through the mimetic somatic transfer.
3. The regulatory (ideosomatic) circulation or reticulation of such somatomimeses through an entire group in the somatic exchange.
4. The "klugey" nature of social regulation through the somatic exchange, leading to various idiosomatic failures and refusals to be fully regulated.

In addition, he has tied additional concepts to somatic theory along the way: the proprioception of the body politic as a homeostatic balancing between too much familiarity and too much strangeness (Robinson 2008); tensions between loconormativity and xenonormativity, the exosomatization of places, objects, and skin color, and paleosomaticity (Robinson 2013); ecosis and icosis (unpublished work).

== Theraputic Applications ==
=== Somatic Experiencing ===
Somatic Experiencing (SE) is a body-oriented theraputic approach based on somatic theory that aims to treat post-traumatic symptoms by modifying interoceptive and proprioceptive sensations that are associated with traumatic experiences. Review of 16 studies found preliminary evidence that SE can reduce PTSD-related symptoms and can improve well-being in both traumatized and non-traumatized populations. However, the review also noted that the overall quality of studies is mixed, highlighting the need for further randomized controlled trials to establish this treatment as effective.

=== East Asian Arts ===
East Asian somatic therapy refers to a group of mind-body healing practices rooted in Traditional East Asian Medicine that focus on the connection between physical sensations, energy flow (Qi), and emotional well-being. These therapies operate on the principle that the body stores trauma and stress as physical stagnation and dysfunction of the endocrine and nervous system leading to disease and illness.

East Asian somatic practices are often categorised into active mindful movements, passive bodywork, and meditative stillness in groups or as individuals as practiced in the Martial arts.
