= Course atlas =

A course atlas is an online repository of credit and non-credit courses offered by one to many educational providers across a state, region, country or around the world, to facilitate course planning. Courses listed in its database reflect what educational providers offer the public or their private constituents.

== Background ==
The term course atlas describes an online repository containing course offerings from one or more education providers. The course atlas thus allows one to search and find comparable courses exploring the implications of college transfer, curriculum alignment initiatives, transfer evaluation methods, cross-registration functions, dual enrollment strategies, study abroad programs, online registration and course planning.

Historically, colleges, universities, vocational schools, adult education centers, corporate universities and other educational providers publish standalone course catalogs and listings in a variety of formats. The course atlas combines the course listings from individual providers into a single, searchable and maintainable electronic repository abstracting the differences in format to make it easier to search and compare course characteristics and attributes.

A course atlas stores course attributes defining the course, such as title, description, cost, location, subject, cross reference course id, method of instruction, length of instruction, text books, faculty level, meeting times, pre-requisites, co-requisites, number of credits to be awarded, grading method, comparable courses linked by course equivalency, and other descriptive elements. Additionally, the course atlas can attach learning objectives, syllabi, and learning outcomes to each course record.

The first national online course repository in the United States was the National Course Atlas, published by AcademyOne and used by State education agencies and education providers. The National Course Atlas is loaded and synchronized with current course offerings of higher education institutions providing keyword search of 3.5 million courses covering 10,000 subjects. Some of the statewide projects using the National Course Atlas include Pennsylvania, South Carolina, and Utah. The Province of Ontario, Canada has undertaken developing and launching a course atlas to power ONTransfer - Ontario's Council on Articulation and Transfer Portal including all higher education institutional courses in 2012.

Higher education institutions, school districts and other education related organizations assessing formal or sponsored learning reference online course repositories supporting their efforts to search, compare and link course offerings from one another. The National Course Atlas was one of the first examples of an aggregated course repository established in the United States used to support college transfer, course planning, curriculum alignment and course equivalency management - functions that span education providers.
