= Pace Center for Girls =

PACE Center for Girls, Inc.
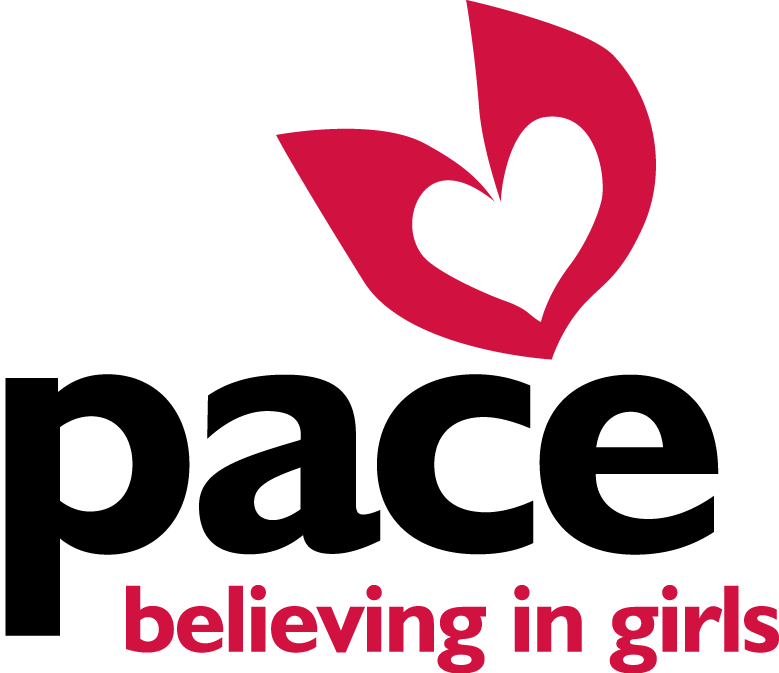
- Type: Non-Profit Organization
- Tax ID no.: 59-2414492
- Headquarters: Jacksonville, FL
- Region served: Florida
- Services: Education
- Website: pacecenter.org
- Formerly called: P.A.C.E. Center for Girls, Inc.

Pace Center for Girls is a 6-12 education program for at-risk teenage girls, headquartered in Jacksonville, Florida. The nonprofit organization was created in 1985 as an intervention program.

== History ==
Pace Center for Girls was created in 1985 by Vicki Burke. In 2008, the Annie E. Casey Foundation called Pace "the most effective program in the United States for keeping adolescent girls out of the juvenile justice system." As of 2016, PACE Center for Girls had 19 locations in Florida with a plan to open another location in Georgia. As of 2020, more than 40,000 girls have been served. The Annie E. Casey Foundation, Children's Defense Fund, National Mental Health Association, National Council on Crime and Delinquency, and the Office of Juvenile Justice and Delinquency Prevention recognize the Pace Center for Girls as a "national model for reducing recidivism and improving school success, employment and self-sufficiency amongst girls."

== Curriculum ==
Pace Center for Girls uses a gender-specific model. According to CEO Mary Marx, whereas boys become outwardly aggressive when affected by trauma, girls tend to be self-destructive and inwardly aggressive. The organization recognizes that a girl's pathway into the justice system often includes a history of abuse, academic failure, and harmful relationships; "PACE is recognized as a national leader in preventing at-risk girls from entering the juvenile justice system". Of the girls in the program in 2015: "31 percent had a history of abuse in the home, 42 percent had a parent or sibling in prison, and 44 percent had moved three or more times in the last five years." Common issues among students are teen pregnancy, mental health disorders, juvenile records and self-mutilation. While a pupil at PACE, students go through life skills classes, focusing on positive decision-making. Each girl is also assigned a counselor, who performs home visits monthly.

=== Services provided ===
Pace Center for Girls provides services including nurse case management, family planning, and women's health exams.
