= Credit transfer =

Credit transfer can refer to:

- The transfer of money from one account to another, also called a wire transfer
- The procedure of granting credit to a student for studies completed at another school, is also called transfer credit or advanced standing
