= Susan Battye =

New Zealand playwright and schoolteacher

Susan Battye ONZM
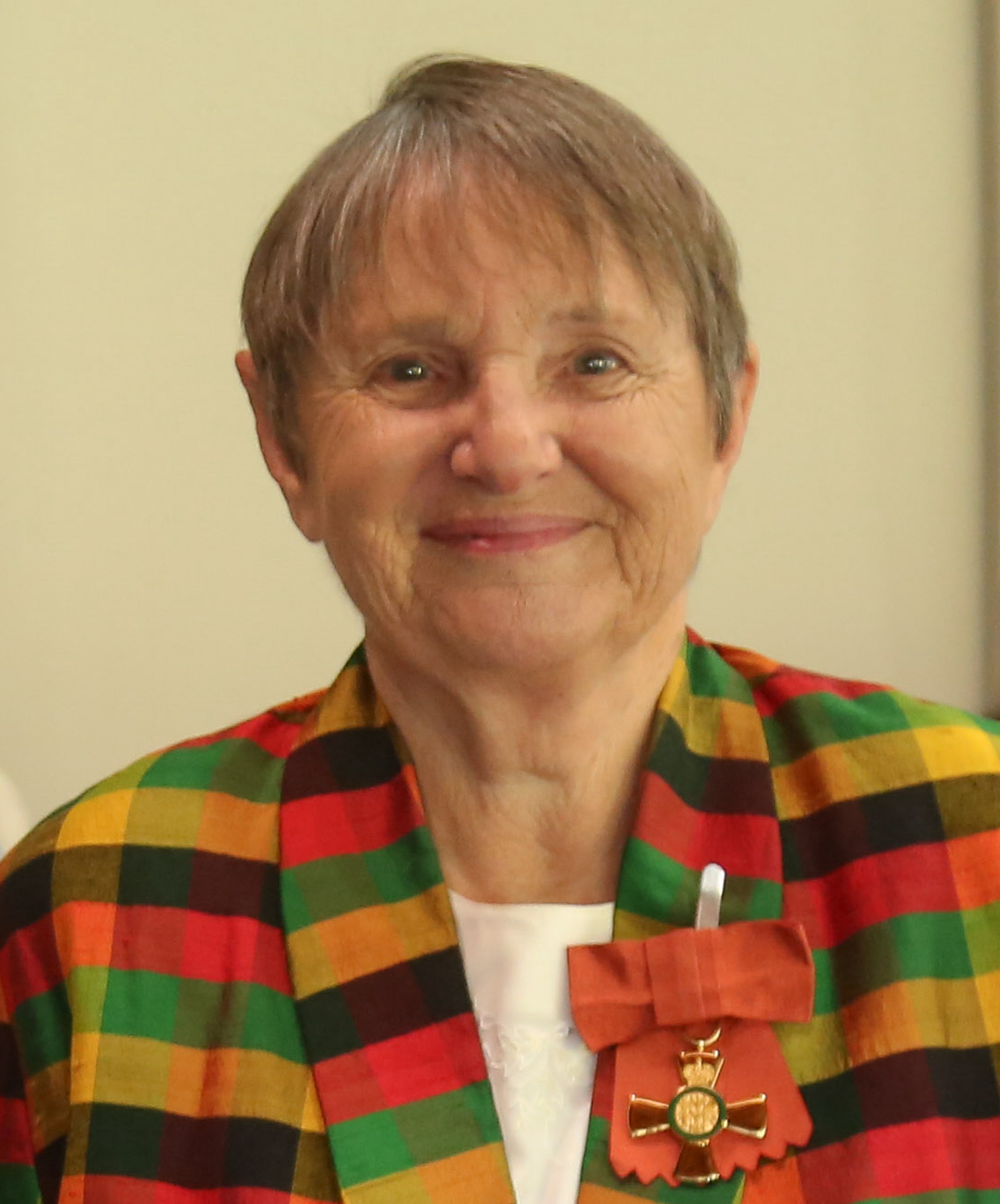
- Awards: Officer of the New Zealand Order of Merit

Academic background
- Education: Christchurch Girls' High School, University of Canterbury, Christchurch Teachers' College, Newcastle University
- Academic advisor: Dorothy Heathcote

Academic work
- Institutions: Epsom Girls' Grammar School

Susan Battye ONZM (born 1950) is a New Zealand playwright and drama teacher. In 2024 Battye was appointed an Officer of the New Zealand Order of Merit for services to performing arts education.

== Education ==
Battye was born in 1950. She attended Christchurch Girls High School, and then completed a Bachelor of Arts at the University of Canterbury in 1974. She trained as a teacher at Christchurch Teachers' College, and then studied at Newcastle University under Dorothy Heathcote in 1979, earning a Diploma in Drama and Education. Battye also gained a Master of Arts in Education Studies from Loughborough University of Technology in 1993.

== Career ==
Battye worked at Greymouth High School from 1974 until 1983, when she moved to Epsom Girls Grammar School, where she became Head of Drama. She also taught and managed the Bachelor of Māori Performing Arts programme at Te Wānanga O Aotearoa.

Battye's plays include The Shadow of the Valley (with Thelma Eakin), first performed in 1977 in Greymouth and published by Oxford University Press in 1980, which reconstructs the 1896 Brunner Mine disaster. Battye and Eakin also wrote a historical novel based on the play, The Mine’s Afire, which was shortlisted for the New Zealand Post Children’s Book Awards in 2010. Other published plays include Living In, Easy as Pie, Not for School but for Life and Radio Waves. The Singing Lesson, published in 1992, is based on a Katherine Mansfield short story. Battye also co-wrote Ponsonby Road with Tim Bray.

Battye was the founding president of the New Zealand Association for Drama in Education (now known as Drama NZ), which was established in 1985.

== Honours and awards ==
In the 2024 New Year Honours, Battye was appointed an Officer of the New Zealand Order of Merit for services to performing arts education.
