= Transfer credit =

Process of granting credit to transfer students

Transfer credit, credit transfer, and advanced standing are the terms used by colleges and universities for the procedure of granting credit to a student for educational experiences or courses undertaken at another institution. This is a subset of recognition of prior learning (which also includes prior work or non-institutional experience for credit).

"Advanced standing" is also used to describe the status of a student granted credit, as distinct from normal course entrants who commence the stream of study at the beginning.

== Background ==
When a student transfers, they usually provide their academic transcript(s) which lists the course taken, grade, and other attributes from each institution they attended when applying for enrollment. Each transcript and the listed courses are tentatively evaluated to see if any of the courses taken satisfy the requirements of the receiving institution.

Transfer credit is not official until an academic officer of the college or university provides a written verification that the award has been accepted and applied on the academic transcript meeting the degree requirement. Transfer credit is not guaranteed when a student transfers from one institution to another. Often, some prior course credit completed at another institution is not counted toward the degree requirement, extending the student's time to graduation.

Unanticipated factors and the general mobility of society create numerous circumstances under which students may move from one institution to another. Reasons for such movements can include mismatches between students and institutions, employment, military movement, or geographic relocations by the families. A significant challenge with college transfer, whether planned or unplanned, is to aggregate coursework conducted at different institutions with different academic policies, different curricula, and different levels of expected rigor into an academic credential that the issuing institution can stand behind. In the United States, about 40% of students transfer during their studies and, on average, lose more than 40% of their accumulated credits when transferring between institutions, which can increase time and cost to degree completion. College transfer can be complex, because disparate and sometimes non-comparable coursework is brought together, often without prior involvement of the institutions from which the student enrolls and expects to graduate. Research in the United States has found that students may lose a substantial share of earned credits when transferring between institutions, which can increase time and cost to degree completion.

== Credit transferring process ==
The process of transferring credits can be divided into four main parts: what transpires prior to a college transfer, what transpires during college transfer, what transpires after college transfer and what proactive efforts are managed to help define academic pathways and agreements between institutions to streamline college transfer.

Prior to college transfer, a student may engage and receive different levels of advising and counseling from an institution they attend. The advising process affects the course enrollment decisions a student makes, which often leads to expectations that course work will transfer or not, depending upon the acknowledged student aspirations and goals. Often, a student changes goals and aspirations as a result of their course exposure.

During college transfer, a student typically applies to a college or university as a prospective student. Different from traditional applicants, a transfer student's academic history is evaluated. This involves enrollment, transfer professionals and the faculty, and requires an in-depth analysis of every course taken by a student at another college or university and/or also including the evaluation of prior life experiences. A college transfer student applying to another college or university must request academic transcripts from each institution they attended. Each potential receiving institution must wait until they receive the academic transcripts, assemble them by student and match them to the application.

The transcript and course evaluation process can be divided into three distinct stages which result in judgments independent of the student. First, an assessment of the quality of the course must be made. Second, the course must be evaluated on the basis of its comparability to courses at the receiving institution. Finally, the coursework for which credit is granted must be determined to be applicable to the program of study for which the student has applied. Guidance from AACRAO, ACE, and CHEA identifies three factors as fundamental to decisions about awarding credit for learning acquired elsewhere: the educational quality of the acquired learning, the comparability of its content, scope, and rigor to that offered by the receiving institution, and the appropriateness and applicability of the learning experience to the student's program and educational goals.

For purposes of ensuring student success in handling the level of difficulty in the targeted academic program and the required course work, and protecting the integrity of academic credentials, all three judgments must be made for credit to be granted for the transfer student and to avoid having the student take the required courses as documented. Courses of poor quality, courses for which the receiving institution has no general counterpart, and courses that simply do not apply to the program of study being sought are typically not counted toward degree requirements. This standard benefits students by ensuring that they are not inappropriately placed in programs of study and courses for which they are ill-prepared.

Concrete determinations with regard to the three-part analysis described above can range in difficulty. Transfer professionals at institutions with significant transfers-in often have a course-by-course understanding of academic offerings of their sending institutions. This course-level understanding is typically arrived at through intensive reviews of course syllabi, textbooks and supplemental materials used in courses, knowledge of faculty and their qualifications at sending institutions, and lengthy consultations with departmental faculty at the receiving institution in connection with each course.

Once a particular course from a specific institution has been evaluated, if it is encountered again on a different student's transcript, the same course credit decision can be applied until the course content changes. At many institutions, evaluations are captured in course equivalency tables or databases that are available to evaluators as a means of expediting the process.

At most institutions, however, the process is entirely manual, and is driven by the experience and knowledge of expert evaluators. This further complicates how a student can be advised at sending institutions, since much of the knowledge on how course work will count is not readily available to the advisers or students at sending institutions. Usually in the movement from one institution to another, students are evaluated and receive all, partial or no transfer credit for completed courses already taken. The evaluation usually is preliminary prior to enrollment and won't be official until after the student is enrolled and the full degree audit report or checklist is completed and delivered to the student. As a result of the time lapse, students often learn they need to take additional course work or re-take course work that was not sufficient to meet the degree requirements for their selected program of study.

Institutions generally require a minimum satisfactory grade in each course taken. Students should check course equivalency maps and transfer guides to validate how courses in one institution will relate to the potential receiver institution. Even though prior courses may be comparable, it does not mean the receiving institution will count the course credit toward degree completion. Prior courses taken could either be accepted as electives, accepted as filling a degree requirement or not accepted at all.

== State and institutional initiatives ==
Historically, two-and four-year college transfer and articulation agreements were primarily institutional initiatives rather than state mandates. Now, nearly every state has some policy on college transfer of credits for students moving from public two- to four-year institutions. States and institutions advertise and promote transferability, pathways and methods differently across the education sectors.

State legislatures have enacted bills to mandate state oversight, audit and development of procedures that would provide uniformity and increased transparency. There still remains striking differences across the United States because there is no federal or national policy to support college transfer. Much debate has arisen around college transfer from its effect on affordability to how it has extended time to degree.

Student mobility is not just within states; some 40% of students transfer across state boundaries. College transfer policies and practices among the states usually avoid the cross state issues. As a result, these differences include not only how policies and practices were initially established, but also their degree of selectivity, granularity, coverage and uniformity is applied in practice at the institutional level.

There is no single model of college transfer and course articulation processes can be identified as the universal standard or even as the preferred model. In the United States, most states employ a combination of approaches ranging from informal efforts of transfer professionals that try to do right by the student, to more formal institution-based agreements, to state-mandated policies. College transfer has been problematic and costly to students, institutions and the states subsidizing higher education. States such as Florida, Minnesota, Ohio, Arizona, New Jersey, Indiana, Illinois, Washington, California, Texas and Pennsylvania have stepped in to define regulations, methods and standards of practice for institutions to follow when evaluating college transfer applicants.

In particular, the state of Texas is actively looking at transfer issues as part of the Closing the Gaps 2015 initiative. The National Institute for the Study of Transfer Students hosted a statewide conference on May 22, 2009.

== Transfer Credits in Canada ==
In Canada, the Pan-Canadian Consortium on Admissions & Transfer ("PCCAT") facilitates the implementation of policies and practices that support student mobility and granting of transfer credit to improve access to post-secondary education within and among Provinces and Territories in Canada. Provincial jurisdictions in Canada may have their own agency or council that supports and facilitates their respective transfer systems and manage online tools that support student & transfer mobility. These councils include Alberta Council on Admissions and Transfer (ACAT), British Columbia Council on Admissions and Transfer (BCCAT), Council on Articulations and Transfer of New Brunswick (CATNB), Campus Manitoba (CMB), Nova Scotia Council on Admission and Transfer (NSCAT), Ontario Council on Articulation and Transfer (ONCAT) and Saskatchewan Transfer Credit and Learning Pathways Council (STCLPC).

=== Ontario ===
In 2011, the Ontario Council on Articulation and Transfer (ONCAT) was established to facilitate the transfer of completed post-secondary credits to other institutions and support the development of articulation pathways between institutions within the province. ONCAT is a non-profit organization that holds collaboration as its core value to create appropriate and accessible pathways for student mobility. All 45 public colleges, universities and Indigenous institutes in Ontario are members of ONCAT. As of January 2020, there are over 1,900 unique transfer pathways between Ontario institutions and over 800,000 transfer opportunities available for student mobility. Each year, there are over 60,000 students who utilize these pathways and transfer opportunities. Within Ontario, there are two different types of transfer credits: course to course transfer credit and block program transfer credit. Course to course transfer credit, or course equivalency, refers to when a course at one institution covers the same or similar content as a course at another institution and the original course completed transfers to count as a similar course. A block program transfer credit refers to the type of transfer credits a student is awarded when they graduate from a specific program and continue their studies in a similar program at another institution where an articulation agreement has already been established. Enough transfer credits are awarded through a block program transfer credit pathway to admit a student to the second year of study, also referred to as the student receiving advanced standing. As an example, Wilfrid Laurier University (WLU) has an articulation pathway with all 21 colleges for the Social Service Worker program to WLU's Bachelor of Social Work program. Through this articulation pathway, if a student graduates from the Social Service Worker program and meets the minimum overall average for the Bachelor of Social Work program, they will receive 7.0 transfer credits. This number of transfer credits is equivalent to over one year of full-time studies at WLU.

To help assist students to explore their transfer opportunities within Ontario, ONCAT created a free resource for students called ONTransfer. This online resource provides students with the chance to find out how the courses they have completed at one institution may transfer to another institution, and it can also highlight any possible articulation pathways for their current program to another institution. Since all 45 post-secondary institutions are members of ONCAT, ONTransfer has all the most up to date transfer details for each institution, including website links for transfer credit policies and contact information.

== National to regional accreditation transfer issues ==
Transferring credit from nationally accredited higher education institutions to institutions which have regional accreditation has proved particularly problematic: only 3% of credit transfers occur from a nationally accredited college to a regionally accredited college.

Regionally accredited schools are generally non-profit and academically oriented. Nationally accredited schools are predominantly for-profit and generally offer vocational, career or technical programs. Every college has the right to set standards and refuse to accept transfer credits. However, if a student has gone to a nationally accredited school it may be particularly difficult to transfer credits (or even credit for a degree earned) if he or she then applies to a regionally accredited college. Some regionally accredited colleges have general policies against accepting any credits from nationally accredited schools, others are reluctant to because they feel that these schools' academic standards are lower than their own or they are unfamiliar with the particular school. The student who is planning to transfer credits from a nationally accredited school to a regionally accredited school should ensure that the regionally accredited school will accept the credits before they enroll in the nationally accredited school.

== Transfer schemes ==
Historically credit transfer has mainly been administered on an ad hoc basis by higher education institutions but it has now become an important area of national and transnational education policy, particularly in relation to mobility between countries and educational sectors. Consequently, agreements between groups of universities have been put in place, such as Australian Group of Eight Universities, and broader schemes have been developed to simplify transfer.

- Credit Accumulation and Transfer Scheme
- European Credit Transfer and Accumulation System
- Scottish Credit and Qualifications Framework

== See also ==
- Course equivalency
- College transfer
- Career college
- Community college
- Junior college
