= Process drama =

Process drama is a method of teaching and learning drama where both the students and teacher are working in and out of role.

== Origins ==
As a teaching methodology, process drama developed primarily from the work of Brian Way, Dorothy Heathcote and Gavin Bolton and through the work of other leading drama practitioners. Cecily O'Neill describes process drama being used to explore a problem, situation, theme or series of related ideas or themes through the use of the artistic medium of unscripted drama. Process drama was described by O'Mara (1999) as" a dynamic way of working that requires teachers to reflect-in-action", constantly dealing with unique situations that require novel approaches. It has its roots in dramatic play, where normally developing children in every culture in the world will create their own imagined worlds, often with the co-participation of an empathetic adult (usually the parent) in role.

== Education ==
Process drama in school settings usually involves the whole class working with the teacher in role in a made-up scenario. When they are working in process drama, the students and teachers work together to create an imaginary dramatic world within which issues are considered and problems can be solved. In this world they work together to explore problems and issues such as, "How do communities deal with change?", "How do we accept other people into our community?" or themes such as environmental sustainability, betrayal, truth and other ethical and moral issues. Sometimes the work may begin as light-hearted, but the teacher always layers more dramatic tension and complexity into the work as the teacher is aiming for a pedagogical outcome. Students learn to think beyond their own points of view and consider multiple perspectives on a topic through playing different roles. For instance, if the issue being discussed is logging a forest, they may play the loggers, people who live in the forest community and environmentalists. Playing a range of positions encourages them to be able to recast themselves as the "other" and to consider life from that viewpoint, thereby creating complexity and enabling us to explore multiple dimensions of the topic. Process drama does what the character Atticus Finch advocates: the ability to work for social justice comes from the ability to understand another perspective—to be able to try on someone else's shoes and walk around in them for a while. Process drama allows us to "try on" other people's shoes, to walk the paths they tread and to see how the world looks from their point of view.

== Applications ==
Process drama is also suggested as a tool to promote literacy development in secondary school and through opportunities for dramatic play in early childhood settings within which children speak for a range of purposes in role.
