= Passive review =

Passive review is the opposite of active recall, in which the learning material is processed passively (e.g., by reading, watching, etc.).

For example, to improve memory through passive review, an individual may read a text today; to not forget it, it is repeated tomorrow and then 4 days later and then 8, 16, 32, 64, etc., days later. They don't ask themselves to explain the content of the text, but only reread the content. If they think to recall something, they are more likely to keep it in their memory. A passive review strategy includes music as an accompaniment. Particularly, the learner listens to Baroque music playing in the background while rhythmically repeating key material.

Passive review can also be combined with other learning strategy to further enhance outcomes. For instance, the so-called Suggestive Accelerated Learning and Teaching Techniques (SALTT) alternate it with active recall and are complemented by physical relaxation exercise, and cooperative learning, among others.

Passive review is a simple method, but it is not as effective. Active recall is more complicated and difficult (because it forces one to recall something) but it is highly effective.

== See also ==
- Elaborative encoding
