= Parentocracy =

A parentocracy is a system in which a child's education must conform to the wealth and wishes of parents rather than the abilities and efforts of the pupil.

== Sources ==
Brown, P. (1990) The 'third wave': education and the ideology of parentocracy. British Journal of Sociology 11:1. Is Britain a parentocracy? Exploration of whether we really have a choice in our childs schooling.://bloggerbinding.hubpages.com/hub/parentocracy
