= Running record =

Method of assessing a child's reading level

A running record is a method of assessing a child's reading level that is specific to the Reading Recovery approach to remedial reading instruction. Developed by child psychologist and educator Marie Clay running record is based on the Three cueing model of reading. Exactly how a running record is constructed varies according to the specific purpose for which it will be used and the program for which it is used. However, there are some similarities across methods. First, a child reads a selected book or passage aloud. The teacher or tutor has a copy of the words from the text, typed out on a different piece of paper, or uses a blank sheet of paper and consults the text later. As the child reads, the adult makes a mark for each correctly-read word. However, if the child makes a mistake, the adult might circle the word, write down the type of error, or even write down what incorrect word was said. After the child is finished reading, the adult calculates the percentage of words read correctly and how often the child self-corrected an error. The adult will also conduct a miscue analysis either during the reading session, or after it is completed.

The purpose of a running record is to give the teacher an indication of whether material currently being read is too easy or too difficult for the child, and it serves as an indicator of the areas where a child's reading can improve— for example, if a child frequently makes word substitutions that begin with the same letter as the printed word, the teacher will know to focus on getting the child to look beyond the first letter of a word.
