= Dorothy Heathcote =

British drama teacher and academic

Dorothy Heathcote MBE (29 August 1926 – 8 October 2011) was a British drama teacher and academic who used the method of "teacher in role" as an approach to teaching across the curriculum in schools and later in other settings. She was a highly accomplished teacher of theatre and drama for learning and amongst her many achievements she defined and developed "mantle of the expert" as an approach to teaching. The book she wrote with Gavin Bolton, that explains her Mantle of the expert approach to education, is Drama for Learning (1994). The most significant previous book that explains her approach was written by Betty Jane Wagner and was entitled Dorothy Heathcote: Drama as a Learning Medium.

== Early life ==
She was born in Steeton, West Yorkshire in 1926. After failing her eleven-plus exam she studied at the local elementary school, leaving in July 1940, a month before her 14th birthday, to work alongside her mother as a weaver in a woollen mill.

Heathcote worked there for five years and expected to stay there for the rest of her working life, but at the behest of her fellow workers, the mill boss, Charlie Fletcher, sponsored her to study drama at the Northern Theatre School in Bradford under the guidance of Esme Church. Fletcher told her, as she left, that if it didn't work out there would always be three looms waiting for her at his mill.

== Drama training ==
At theatre school, Heathcote set her heart on becoming an actress. But at the end of her second year Esme Church told her she had no future on the stage, "My dear, you're very talented – quite fearfully so at times, but you are not the right size for your age, for the roles you can play… I think we have to face it." She then suggested teaching.

While undertaking teaching practice, Heathcote travelled around Yorkshire, visiting schools and working with various groups of pupils. Using her training, she invented drama from whatever opportunities presented themselves to her. She also started teaching evening classes at the Bradford Civic, and directing amateur productions in local village halls.

== Academic work ==
In 1951, Heathcote was appointed as a staff tutor at the Durham Institute by Brian Stanley. He took a risk employing such an inexperienced teacher: she had no formal education, no national teacher qualification and virtually no experience of teaching children.

Over the next 10 years, Heathcote's reputation grew as more and more people saw her teach using her remarkable approach. From the beginning, her work was considered unorthodox. In his biography Dorothy Heathcote's Story, Gavin Bolton describes the reaction at the time: "it was anathema to drama specialists, both the traditionalists who saw her work as rejecting real theatre and the progressives who thought she broke all the rules on which Child Drama was founded."

In 1964 Heathcote started teaching a full-time Advanced Diploma course at Newcastle University. In 1979 this alternated yearly with a full-time MEd course. In the 22 years until Heathcote's retirement from Newcastle in 1986, these courses became among the most influential university courses in the country. One of Heathcote's students at Newcastle was New Zealand playwright and drama teacher Susan Battye.

In 1966 her work first appeared on film in Death of a President, a BBC documentary of a drama production she made with boys from a local approved school; in acting out the play the young offenders are made aware of how the consequences of one individual's actions can impact upon the community. She thus became known to a wider audience and began extensively travelling abroad to teach and lecture. In 1972, she was featured on Omnibus in a documentary film celebrating her work called Three Looms Waiting.

Gavin Bolton has suggested that towards the end of the 1960s Heathcote's work experienced what he calls a sea change, as she "moved away from her dramatically and educationally successful use of making up a play, to being a creator of pictures in which she became a fellow reader along with the class." This new way of working led her and her students to spend a great deal of time working in hospitals for the severely handicapped and criminal institutions for young men.

A further change occurred in the early 1980s, which brought Heathcote back into schools. The drama approach she had called, Mantle of the Expert, she designed specifically for teachers who had little experience of drama. "I introduced mantle of the expert work when I was trying to help teachers who didn't understand creating tension by being playwrights and to cut out the need for children having to act, or express feelings and behave like other people".

== After retirement ==
After retiring from Newcastle University in 1986, Heathcote moved to Derby to live with her daughter. She continued teaching and writing, and in May 2005 the university invested her as an honorary Doctor of Letters. She was able to work until her death on 8 October 2011. She was appointed Member of the Order of the British Empire (MBE) in the 2011 Birthday Honours for services to "drama as education".

The archive of her work is lodged within the Faculty of Education, Manchester Metropolitan University.
