= Animated narrative vignette =

An animated narrative vignette (ANV) is an instructional technology used to motivate and facilitate role-playing, problem solving, and discussion. Teachers make use of the ANVs to aid presentations in class or for online training. Students also create them for experiential learning exercises.

Teachers provide computer animated representations to teach concepts and encourage critical thinking. It can also serve as an assessment tool for students’ attitudes and behaviors. Vignettes have been used to teach mathematics and science, management skills, problem solving, and character education.

== See also ==
- Digital puppetry
- Educational technology
- Role play simulation
