= SWCHA =

SWCHA is a homeschool sports organization in Southeast Wisconsin; hence the name: Southeast Wisconsin Christian Homeschool Athletics.
