= Mental management =

Concept in cognitive psychology

Mental management is a concept in the field of cognitive psychology that explores the cognitive, cerebral or thought-based processes in their different forms. Originally developed during the 1970s by French educator and philosopher Antoine de La Garanderie, mental management was developed for individuals to use their own mental activities and processes more effectively.

== History ==
Developed during the 1970s, mental management theory has expanded on several previous academic dialogues. Having first emerged for educational purposes, the mental management approach has been developed on the research of French educator and philosopher Antoine de La Garanderie who identified distinct mental processes that support learning. His research builds on several previous theories, including the works on introspection by Jean Martin Charcot, Alfred Binet, Maine de Biran and Albert Burloud, who was La Garanderie's professor. Today, its studies are used in four domains systematically; individual functioning; education; therapy; and business.

There have been developments over the past century that have combined original and newfound scientific techniques and studies to further our understanding of mental processes and hence, improve mental management. This includes the following activities and processes to manage the mind well: attention; retrieval; comprehension; thinking; and imagining. Managing the mind well involves maximising the effectiveness and efficiency of cognitive processes associated through applying deliberate approaches, processes and activities.

The computer revolution of the 1950s led in turn to a ‘cognitive revolution’ in psychology during the 1960s and 1970s with the focus upon information processing (via analogies to computers and programs) leading to an interest in internal mental processes, rather than just in the overt human behaviour. This led to the development of the cognitive mental process model, which is compared to the behaviourist model to outline the distinction of the scope of cognitive psychology in which the components of mental management will be explored in more detail.

== Theory ==
French philosopher and educator Antoine de La Garanderie's research led to creating awareness in individuals on their own mental activities and processes and to make them develop and use them effectively. His theory aimed to establish educational profiles based on the "mental gestures of learning" specific to each child. According to him, each individual's understanding, memorising and reproducing techniques for information are differentiated. This concept can show the different cognitive mechanisms which play a part in thinking and learning, and ultimately make up mental management.

The three main components of mental management include project; evocation; and mental gestures. By defining a project, the learning strategy will differ and the requirements will enable them to implement an effective and appropriate method.

Evocation is the voluntary mental reconstruction procedure of all perceptions coming from the external world through senses. Evocation is the foundation stone of La Garanderie's theory, allowing individuals to reproduce what they learn at a later point in time. There are three specific profiles of evocation corresponding to a particular channel that the child uses to imagine the information:

1. Visual evocation includes the transformation of textual information into visual information, for example drawings, diagrams and the use of colour in underlining.

2. Auditory evocation includes oral or mental repetition of information, for example listening to lessons on an audio device.

3. Kinaesthetic evocation includes movements, feelings, smells and tastes, for example the use of gestures and movements to learn.

Constituting mental management is the organisation, improvement and use of these activities and processes.

=== Cognitive psychology ===
Cognitive psychology is the study of the mind as an information processor. It rose to great importance in the mid-1950s due to the dissatisfaction with the behaviourist psychological models. The emphasis of psychology shifted away from studying the mind in favour of understanding human information processing, relating to perception, attention, language, memory, thinking, and consciousness. The main concern of cognitive psychology is how information is received from the senses, processed by the brain and how this processing directs how humans behave. It is a multifaceted approach in which various cognitive functions work together to understand not only individuals and groups, but also society as a whole.

=== Behaviourist model vs. cognitive model ===
Mental Management falls within the cognitive model of psychology and needs to be distinguished from the behaviourist model, which considers mental processes to be unobservable and therefore akin to a ‘black box’. More specifically, the behaviourist model assumes that the process linking behaviour to the stimulus cannot be studied. It therefore describes the conceptualisation of psychological disorders in terms of overt behaviour patterns produced by learning and the influence of reinforcement contingencies. Treatment techniques associated with this approach include systematic de-sensitisation and modelling and focusing on modifying ineffective or maladaptive patterns.

In contrast, the cognitive model represents a theoretical view of thought and mental operations, provides explanations for observed phenomena and makes predictions about behavioural consequences. Specifically, it describes the mental events that connect the input from the environment with the behavioural output. The approach assumes that people are continually creating and accessing internal representations (models) of what they are experiencing in the world for the purposes of perception, comprehension, and behaviour selection (action). Treatment techniques associated with this approach include cognitive behavioural therapy which involves defining, observing, analysing and interpreting patterns, and reframing these as more optimal ways of thinking.

== Processes of mental management ==
There are five different processes of mental management, which La Garanderie distinguishes as different types of mental gestures.

=== Attention ===
In psychology, attention is defined as "a state in which cognitive resources are focused on certain aspects of the environment rather than on others and the central nervous system is in a state of readiness to respond to stimuli." In mental management it describes the essential first step required to enable the subsequent step of retrieving memorized information. The gesture of attention is linked to the perception from our five senses and the evocation of the subject. For example, a parent or teacher can activate a child's attention with instructive phrases using the imperative tense.

=== Retrieval ===
Retrieval is defined by the American Psychological Association as "the process of recovering or locating information stored in memory. Retrieval is the final stage of memory, after encoding and retention." These associated stages are dealt with on an implicit basis in mental management. Retrieval is distinguished by La Garanderie as the gesture of memorisation, which involves bringing back evocations for the purpose of reproducing them in the short-, medium-, and long-term.

=== Comprehension ===
Comprehension is defined as the "act or capability of understanding something, especially the meaning of a communication," by the American Psychological Association. It involves making sense in a subjective sense which does not require the understanding to be correct. La Garanderie distinguishes comprehension as the gesture of understanding, which allows us to constantly shift between what is perceived and what is evoked to find the meaning of new information.

=== Thinking ===
The American Psychological Association defines thinking as a "cognitive behaviour in which ideas, images, mental representations or other hypothetical elements of thought are experienced or manipulated." In the context of mental management, the thinking process also involves "self-reflection" which involves the "examination, contemplation and analysis of ones thoughts, feeling and actions". Thinking, or the gesture of reflection, involves selecting the notions or theory that has already been learnt, and allow us to think through the task to be accomplished.

=== Imagining ===
Imagination is the faculty that produces ideas and images in the absence of direct sensory data, often by combining fragments of previous sensory experiences into new syntheses. It is a critical component of mental management as it captures the change involved in improving or optimising the mental processes. The gesture of creative imagination allows for an individual to invent new approaches based on what they already know. This allows individuals to make comparisons and develop responses to problems outside of a logical framework.

== Measurement of mental processes ==
The measurement of mental processes can involve invasive or non-invasive ways to measure human activity in the brain, known as neuroimaging. Neuroimaging is defined as "a clinical specialty concerned with producing images of the brain by non-invasive techniques, such as computed tomography and magnetic resonance imaging." Computed tomography is “radiography in which a three-dimensional image of a body structure is constructed by computer from a series of plane cross-sectional images made along an axis.” Magnetic resonance imaging, commonly referred to as MRI, is "a noninvasive diagnostic technique that produces computerised images of internal body tissues and is based on nuclear magnetic resonance of atoms within the body induced by the application of radio waves." These advances help to understand brain specificity, and therefore were able to contribute to theories of mental management processes. Through these methods of measuring mental processes, it was found that different parts of the brain are responsible for different mental processes, for example that the frontal lobe is responsible for abstract thinking.

== Practical applications of mental management ==
The principles of mental management apply practically to many aspects in the real world, particularly in the areas of education and individual development. To develop the mental management processes in education, necessary knowledge, skills, methods and techniques are taught to students to help them understand how their minds work and to help them discover the ways to work their minds more efficiently in the education process. These teachings are carried out in three steps: (1) getting to know the mind; (2) developing skills; and (3) attaining mental independence. These practices are now being applied beyond education at an individual level in the context of self-improvement as well as in the work domain, including managers and leaders.

Mental management theories were applied to a real-life case study in Mancinelli, Gentili, Priori, and Valituttis’ 2004 study on concept maps in kindergarten. The study's finding was that real learning is derived from the child's evocation, as defined by La Garanderie. Evocation is the voluntary mental reconstruction procedure of all perceptions coming from the external world through senses. The project concluded that the child builds meanings of their senses through evocation, with perception and evocation both key in specifying the information to learn from. Without such a mental activity, learning is partial and lacks important parts. Further findings showed that the observer's mental characteristics affect the contents derived by the child from observation. The interaction, perception and evocation processes unveil correct concepts and misconceptions. Using methods of La Garanderie's pedagogic dialogue, children were reached mentally and disclosed their thoughts on their experience. The child's thoughts were found to be guided by the project's success or failure and accordingly the child's thoughts divert from their infantile characteristics and progress and adjust slowly.
