= Framework for Intervention =

The Framework for Intervention is a preventive approach to meet concerns about behaviour in schools and nurseries. It concentrates on helping staff to change the school environment, rather than the child. This means that all the factors that might affect the student or child's behaviour in the classroom or around the school can be analysed. To change the environment, it offers teachers and other school staff a structure for planning, carrying out and evaluating their ideas.

Evaluation has shown that changing something in the environment for the better almost always improves the behaviour of the child, and also the behaviour of others in the class.

It was introduced by Birmingham (UK) City Council Education Department in 1997 and now being used across the UK and Ireland. In Norway where it is known as "Fin Stil" (Fine Style), it was due to be extended nationwide from 2009.
