= Business Education Initiative =

The Business Education Initiative (BEI) is a British study-abroad programme for students from Northern Ireland. It was run initially by the Department for Employment and Learning but, since 2006, is delivered by the British Council in association with the Department for Employment and Learning in Northern Ireland.

== Activities ==
Each year approximately 100 students are selected to study business related subjects at participating U.S. colleges and universities. The majority of the student's transport and living expenses are met by the British Council while the US host-institution grants the students a fee-waiver or scholarship.

== History ==
The programme was established in 1994 and to date approximately 1,350 students have participated. It has proven to be a once in a lifetime experience for the majority of the students who have graduated from the program.

== Eligibility ==
Applications are accepted from pre-final year undergraduate degree or HND students studying at a Northern Irish higher education college or university.

In the past, the majority of students on the programme have come from the following institutions:

- The Queen's University of Belfast
  - St. Mary's University College
  - Stranmillis University College
- University of Ulster
- Belfast Metropolitan College
- South Eastern Regional College

== Participating U.S. institutions ==
A list of participating U.S. colleges and universities for the 2010-2011 academic year is available here (external link).
