= Tele-TASK =

Tele-TASK is a university research project in the e-learning area. It can be applied to lecture recording, post-processing and distribution. Research topics include e-learning, tele-teaching, semantic web, video analysis, speech recognition, collaborative learning, social networking, web technologies, recommendation systems, statistics and video codecs and conversion.

The project was founded by Christoph Meinel and his research group at the University of Trier. When he accepted the chair for Internet Technologies and Systems at Hasso Plattner Institute at the University of Potsdam/Germany, the tele-TASK project also moved with him.

Reference software was developed as proof of concept, such as an online e-lecture archive a lecture recording system and a post-production tool.
