= My Pedagogic Creed =

1897 article by John Dewey

My Pegagogic Creed
- Author: John Dewey
- Subject: Education
- Publication date: January 1897
- Text: My Pegagogic Creed at Wikisource

"My Pedagogic Creed" is an article written by John Dewey and published in School Journal in 1897. The article is broken into five sections, with each paragraph beginning "I believe." They address the nature and goals of education (including the relationship of the individual student psyche to societal conditions), the school as a social institution, the importance of the student's social activities, precepts on the educational method, and the role of the school in shaping societal values and structures.

== Summary ==
=== What education is ===
According to John Dewey's article "My Pedagogic Creed" (1897), education is only as individual as our society allows it to be. We (people) are unconsciously trained from birth. Our social consciousness, our cultural ways and what we value are a mock up of a collective social being, according to Dewey. We are all a product of our social surroundings from birth through adulthood and death. Eventually we "become an inheritor of the funded capital of civilization." Dewey exerts that individual best is achieved in the spirit of and for the greater good. "Through these demands he is stimulated to act as a member of a unity, to emerge from his original narrowness of action and feeling and to conceive of himself from the standpoint of the welfare of the group to which he belongs." As a member of society, we are confined to language and its meanings, but also empowered by it.

Dewey believes that "the educational process has two sides." Psychological and sociological impacts are two sides of the education process that go hand-in-hand; "neither can be subordinated to the other or neglected without evil results following." Psychology provides the foundation of education while sociology provides the scenario. Unless what is taught and how we teach relates to students' lives, it can become stressful. Even good grades are not indicative of authentic learning. Students may become disenfranchised. Psychology and social dynamics must exist in conjunction with each other to create a truly internal experience. It is important to know what is happening in the world-at-large, according to Dewey. One must also look at the student's world to ensure success relevant to their own realm of accomplishment. "We must also be able to project them into the future to see what their outcome and end will be." Dewey holds that we must look into the individual future of every student and see what their own outlook is and how we can get there—not a collective outlook defined by blanket societal expectations of success by every person. Dewey states, "To know what a power really is we must know what its end, use, or function is." In sum, a student cannot achieve power over their future until they know what their future can be. Teachers cannot prepare students for a future we cannot foretell as a result of ever-changing technology. People can truly prepare for the future by empowering students. In Dewey's words, "To prepare him for the future life means to give him command of himself." Hands-on learning that utilizes the senses and capacity of the student creates the most success, intrinsically and externally. Dewey believes "that the individual who is to be educated as a social individual and that society is an organic union of individuals." Demonstration of this success shows a psychological process. Utilizing the skills derived from effective psychological learning, social factors can be successfully recognized and addressed.

=== What the school is ===
Education is a social process. According to the creed, it should not be used for the purposes of preparation for living in the future. Dewey said, "I believe that education, therefore, is a process of living and not a preparation for future living." We can build a child's self-esteem in not only the classroom but in all aspects of his or her life. Education must always stay true to children and align with their reality in order to be true. Dewey argues that some children are over labeled and misunderstood because we take away authentic experiences by not relating education to natural human order. More importantly he emphasizes, "Existing life is so complex that the child cannot be brought into contact with it without either confusion or distraction... and he becomes either unduly specialized or else disintegrated."

Dewey believes that education and school ought to be an extension of home. Personal background is psychological and gives way to new ideas. This is summed up in the quote, "It is the business of the school to deepen and extend his sense of the values bound up in his home life." In schools currently, the information is given, lessons are learned and habits are formed, similar to the banking model of education criticised by Paulo Freire in his 1970 book Pedagogy of the Oppressed. Dewey states that this is not effective. Working together is vital to unity and success. He states, "The present educational systems, so far as they destroy or neglect this unity, render it difficult or impossible to get any genuine, regular moral meanings." We need to see school as a social experience, according to this creed. The teacher is the guide and chooses what relevant experience will guide each child through the education process. When it comes to assessment, Dewey states that grading should be relevant to the child's own progress. Exams are to be used for social ordering rather than individual upkeep.

=== The subject-matter of education ===
Following suit with his other theories, Dewey believes that subject matter should reflect students' real lives. Schools focus on too many subjects, which may not reflect the students' actual experiences. The child's own activities should determine curriculum. For example, students are often given literature lessons at the beginning of the learning experience, when it is the sum of events, making the subject relevant for the end of learning; this gives the student time to shape his or her own views before being told how history or someone else has seen something. It should be given at the end as a summative reflection.

We need to let children be constructive and pave their own paths, according to Dewey. "I believe that the only way to make a child conscious of his social heritage is to enable him to perform those fundamental types of activity which makes civilization what it is." Dewey takes on a constructive point of view. He says that at times vocations may be more relevant and should be main subjects. In order to learn formal subjects, students need to be relaxed. Dewey explains that in order to achieve that, they must be comfortable with what they have learned up to that point. All subjects are relevant to life.

=== The nature of method ===
1. Dewey asserts that active participation far surpasses passive learning. Action must come before anything else. We create children's negative perceptions of school. Ideas come from movement. Symbols give an inaccurate and incomplete view of the big picture. They impact the student's ability to think authentically.
2. Envisioning the message helps with retention. Imagery is so important in generating relevancy to one's life.
3. It is the teacher's job to pay attention to student's blooming interests and expand on them for a one of a kind learning experience. Interest is power and we must harbor that interest.
4. Welcome emotions in education. They are part of the important aspects of learning.

=== The school and social progress ===
In Dewey's words, "education is the fundamental method of social progress and reform." Social consciousness shapes individual perceptions. Society also has an obligation to reform education. As a society we are responsible for one another. "I believe it is the business of every one interested in education to insist upon the school as the primary and most effective instrument of social progress and reform in order that society may be awakened to realize what the school stands for, and aroused to the necessity of endowing the educator with sufficient equipment properly to perform his task." Education is the perfect combination of art and science. Dewey sees that we must use individuality for the greater good. Dewey recognizes that teaching is noble and selfless. Teachers show us our way.
