= Teacher in role =

Educational methodology

Teacher in Role is an educational technique used especially in the teaching of drama and dramatic literature, however its applications can span across the entire subject spectrum. Educators utilising the technique adopt a character or 'role', with the intent of engaging typically younger students in a fictional or historically inspired setting to convey desired concepts, attitudes and ideals.

== Rationale of the Methodology ==
If the role of a teacher is to teach, the role of a student must be to learn. However, it has been agreed that learning is not only an exercise in reading and reciting facts, but in gaining a deeper insight of events and situations. This is where drama becomes an invaluable tool. Through the use of drama and dramatic conventions a teacher does not only teach and learn the "what" but also the "why" and "how".

Drama techniques in education allows students to take a step back out of usual teaching techniques. Students are able to communicate better in conceptual, personal and social levels as they are able to be a listener, speaker and receiver of knowledge. By using role-play, the teacher gives them a way to view and think about a situation using the "implied" behaviour for the role they are given. In turn, the teacher can allow the students to become in charge of their own learning and facilitate them in it. We empower the individual making their expertise greater than our own. Through role-playing, they gain knowledge of what the role entails, and thus insight into the experience and emotions of characters in those circumstances. Additionally, the technique improves personal social techniques in students, like eye contact and gestures.

== Methodology in Practice ==
Teachers choose roles carefully in order to engender different interactions and dynamics within the context of the dramatic environment. Adopting different roles in a fictional setting and allowing students to explore the information of the setting through dialogue is an interactive and engaging method of teaching. Teacher-in-role theory highlights particularly the significance of differing status of the role in relation to the role of the students. Differing between a high status character (such as a king) and a low status character (such as a peasant) allows students to explore and engage with a range of differing experiences and emotions. Skilled educators can manipulate these dynamics to supplement teaching theory or larger concepts. Alternatively, the teacher can encourage students to use their own imagination and derive information from implied context behind their own roles. One of the best teacher in roles practices in this manner is a TV talk show interviewing various people (students) from educational books/stories.

== Mantle of the expert ==
Mantle of the Expert is a drama in education device designed by Dorothy Heathcote. In Mantle of the Expert, students are in-role as experts in any given area. They cannot be simply told that they are experts, they have to really take on the role, and feel as if they are experts. This can be done through a number of character development games or exercises. The teacher is generally in-role in Mantle of the Expert, and provides a structure upon which the students can build to gradually progress to more independent learning. Mantle of the Expert is described, explained and exemplified in the book Drama for Learning: Dorothy Heathcote's Mantle of the Expert Approach to Education, by Dorothy Heathcote and Gavin Bolton.
