= Actual development level =

How much a child can achieve independently

Actual development level refers to how much a child can achieve independently without the assistance of parents, teachers, or peers.

== See also ==
- Potential development level
