= Videobook =

VideoBook is a brand of online, interactive educational videos marketed by Studio 21. Payment for the information contained in VideoBooks takes place in credit, after reading it.

== History ==
"VideoBook" was registered and used in the United Kingdom (UK) in 1982 by Barry R. Pyatt, the owner of Yorkshire film producers "Studio 21". VideoBook was the marque, trading title and style for local-interest and sell-through video films. "VideoBook" was in commercial use by Studio 21 in the UK and Spain until 2003. In 2004, Pyatt opened AngelFilms in Spain, which took over the marque. In 2005, AngelFilms-UK was established, and in 2008, VideoBook products were re-launched in the UK.

== Marque ==
VideoBooks are registered with the ISBN agencies. The trademark style is as one word, with uppercase V and uppercase B, in a modified Bookman typeface, and is Pyatt's exclusive property.

The name "videobook" (without the two uppercase characters) has become a standard term for a form of online training that delivers downloadable training videos. Most video books are single website entities that focus on teaching a particular topic.

== Video books ==
Video books are similar in content and structure to other books. The videos are typically recorded by a trained instructor and offered on a subscription model. The user visits the website containing the training videos), purchases a subscription and can then download the videos.

VideoBooks are different from many computer-based training models in that they are typically in a shareable and portable format. They also differ in content delivery. VideoBooks are unlike alternatives from companies like PrintAVizion, manufacturer for other businesses to promote services and products to prospecting clients.

In contrast to printed books and audio books which rely on text and audio, respectively, the basic component of a videobook is video. The videobook can have on-screen text along with pictures and video clips. The text may be animated along with related audio background commentary.

Students can watch videos in any order. Once downloaded, no Internet connection is necessary. The videos use non-proprietary formats. The target market is usually an individual instead of an organization. Video book materials may involve presentation software such as PowerPoint, screen-capture software such as Camtasia and text-to-speech software, such as TextAloudMP3.

== See also ==
- Computer-based training
- E-learning
- Web-based training
