= Diploma plc =

Electronics & services business

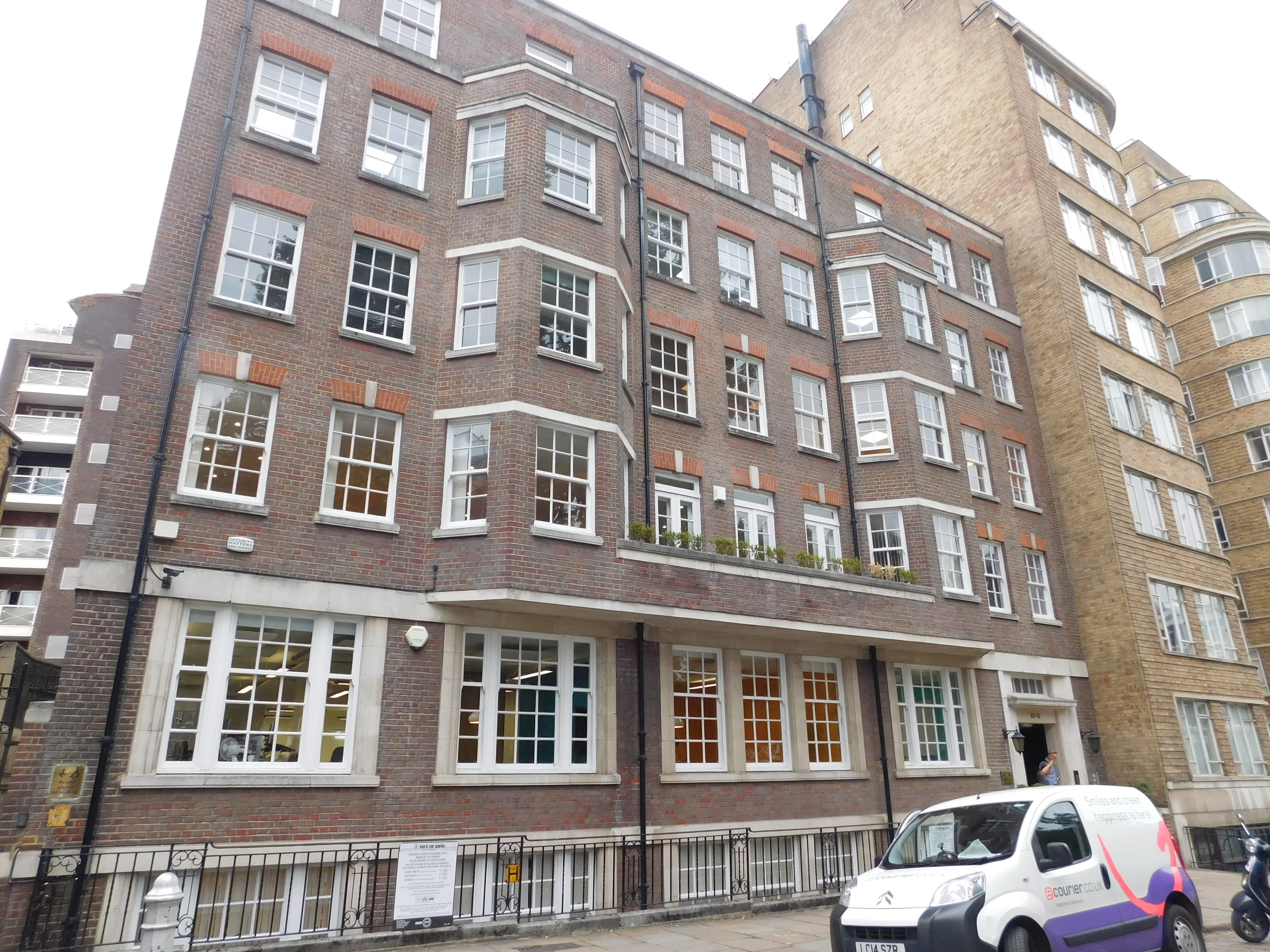
- Headquarters in Charterhouse Square, London, UK
- Type: Public
- Traded as: LSE: DPLM; FTSE 100 component
- Industry: Technical products and services
- Founded: 1931; 95 years ago
- Headquarters: London, United Kingdom
- Key people: David Lowden, (Chairman); Johnny Thomson (CEO)
- Products: Control systems, seals, live science systems
- Revenue: ▲£1,840.3 million (2026)
- Operating income: ▲£487.1 million (2026)
- Net income: ▲£258.8 million (2026)
- Website: www.diplomaplc.com

Diploma plc is a British business supplying specialised technical products and services based in London, England. It is a constituent of the FTSE 100 Index.

== History ==
The company was founded in 1931. It was first listed on the London Stock Exchange in 1960, and was a market leader in electronic component distribution, building products and special steels until the late 1980s.

In September 1999, Diploma sold its 94 percent stake in the electronic component distribution business SEI Macro to the US distributor Avnet in exchange for £37.5 million. One year later, its building products business under the Robert Lee brand was also sold. In 2001, Diploma divested its special steels business, Henry Whitham, for £11.1 million.

In December 2008, the company acquired RT Dygert International, a US-based distributor of seals. In March 2015, it purchased Kubo Tech, a Swiss-based seals distributor.

It was announced in August 2018, that CEO Richard Ingram would be stepping down after four months in charge, with John Nicholas acting as executive chairman in interim charge. In January 2020, investors expressed concern about the bonus package offered to the new CEO, Johnny Thomson.

The company acquired Simonsen & Weel, a Danish medical equipment supplier, in January 2021, Tennessee Industrial Electronics, a Nashville-based parts distributor, for £76 million in March 2023, and Distribuidora Internacional Carmen, a Spanish-based distributor of fluid power products, for £170 million in July 2023. One year later, it purchased Plastic and Rubber Group Holdings Limited (PAR) for £38 million.

== Operations ==
Diploma is a distributor, operating in the three sectors of Controls (including specialised wiring), Seals (including seals and gaskets) and Life Sciences (including consumables and instrumentation).

The company has operations in North America, Europe, Australia, New Zealand, New Caledonia, and China.
