= Mantle of the expert =

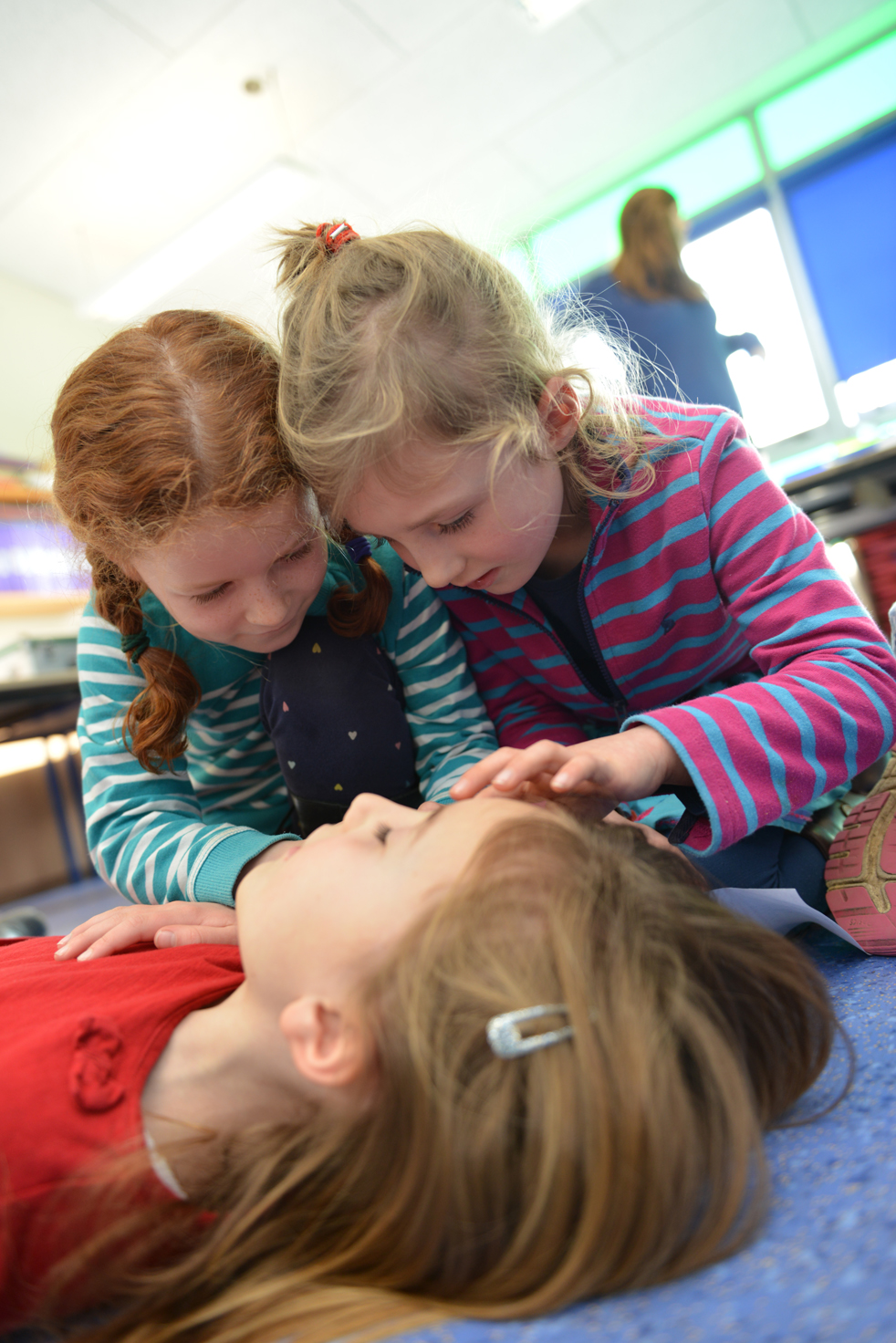
Students working in a Mantle of the Expert context as a team of park rangers performing an operation on an injured animal.

Mantle of the Expert is an education approach that uses imaginary contexts to generate purposeful and engaging activities for learning. Within this fictional framework, students are cast as a team of experts working for a client on a commission. The commission is designed by the teacher to generate tasks and activities that meet the client's requirements and provide opportunities for students to explore various curriculum areas. For instance, a class might be cast as archaeologists excavating an Egyptian tomb for the Cairo Museum. To complete the commission, they would research ancient Egyptian history, covering topics such as tombs, artifacts, and rituals. This approach enables the study of history, geography, art, design, and other subjects, while also developing skills in reading, writing, problem-solving, and inquiry. Mantle of the Expert is intended to be used selectively alongside other teaching methods.

== Development ==
Dorothy Heathcote developed Mantle of the Expert at Newcastle University during the 1970s and 1980s. Heathcote, an internationally renowned authority on drama for learning, aimed to provide non-drama specialists with an approach that supported the use of drama across the curriculum. She believed drama was underused outside drama studios and could serve as a powerful medium for learning across various subjects..

== Origins ==
Heathcote said she didn't as much invent Mantle of the Expert as "find herself doing it." In a 1993 interview with Sandra Hesten, she recounted working with a small group of children on a drama context about the Nativity – "…thinking about it later I thought that's really important – they were expert kings. And then it began to dawn on me. People had to have a point of view. So when I reviewed the week I thought – the point of view of inn-keeping, the point of view of soldiers who are working for Rome, the point of view of angels, the point of view of kings. And that's when it started coming together."

This conversation is recorded by Hesten in her PhD thesis and is recounted by Heathcote on at least two further occasions, once in the documentary "Pieces of Dorothy" and in an interview for the Mantle of the Expert website in 2009 - "That was the start, I then started to think, what do I call it? That's when I got this crazy name. Which is extreme not crazy, just fanciful. I can't find a better name." Although Heathcote did not date the 'Nativity' context precisely, it likely occurred in the mid-1970s, around the time she began referring to Mantle of the Expert as a distinct approach in her courses at Newcastle University.

Working with her graduate students at Newcastle University, Heathcote spent much of the late 1970s and 1980s researching, developing, and evaluating Mantle of the Expert in various settings, including primary and secondary schools, special schools, borstals, and adult and child mental hospitals. Her method involved teaching week long sessions, planned in advance with her students, where they played different roles in the classroom. These sessions, often involving improvisation and discussion, were carefully planned and included resources, props, and costumes created by the graduate students. They were experimental in nature, and were analysed, and evaluated by Heathcote and her students, and forming the foundation of the approach. In some cases these 'experiments' were documented.

After retiring in 1987, Heathcote continued to work on Mantle of the Expert and used the approach in various settings worldwide. In 1995, she co-wrote "Drama for Learning: Dorothy Heathcote's Mantle of the Expert Approach to Education" with Gavin Bolton.

== Later Developments ==
Among Heathcote's students in the early 1980s was Luke Abbott, who was then a secondary school drama teacher. After completing his M.A. under Heathcote, Abbott became a Local Authority advisor for Essex County Council. In this role, he used Mantle of the Expert in classrooms to demonstrate its effectiveness with minimal props or resources. His pragmatic approach aimed to make the method easier for teachers to.

In the early 2000s, Abbott organized national and international conferences to promote Mantle of the Expert. With Heathcote as the keynote speaker and classroom teachers running workshops, these conferences aimed to demystify the approach and make it accessible to non-specialist drama teachers.

== Method ==
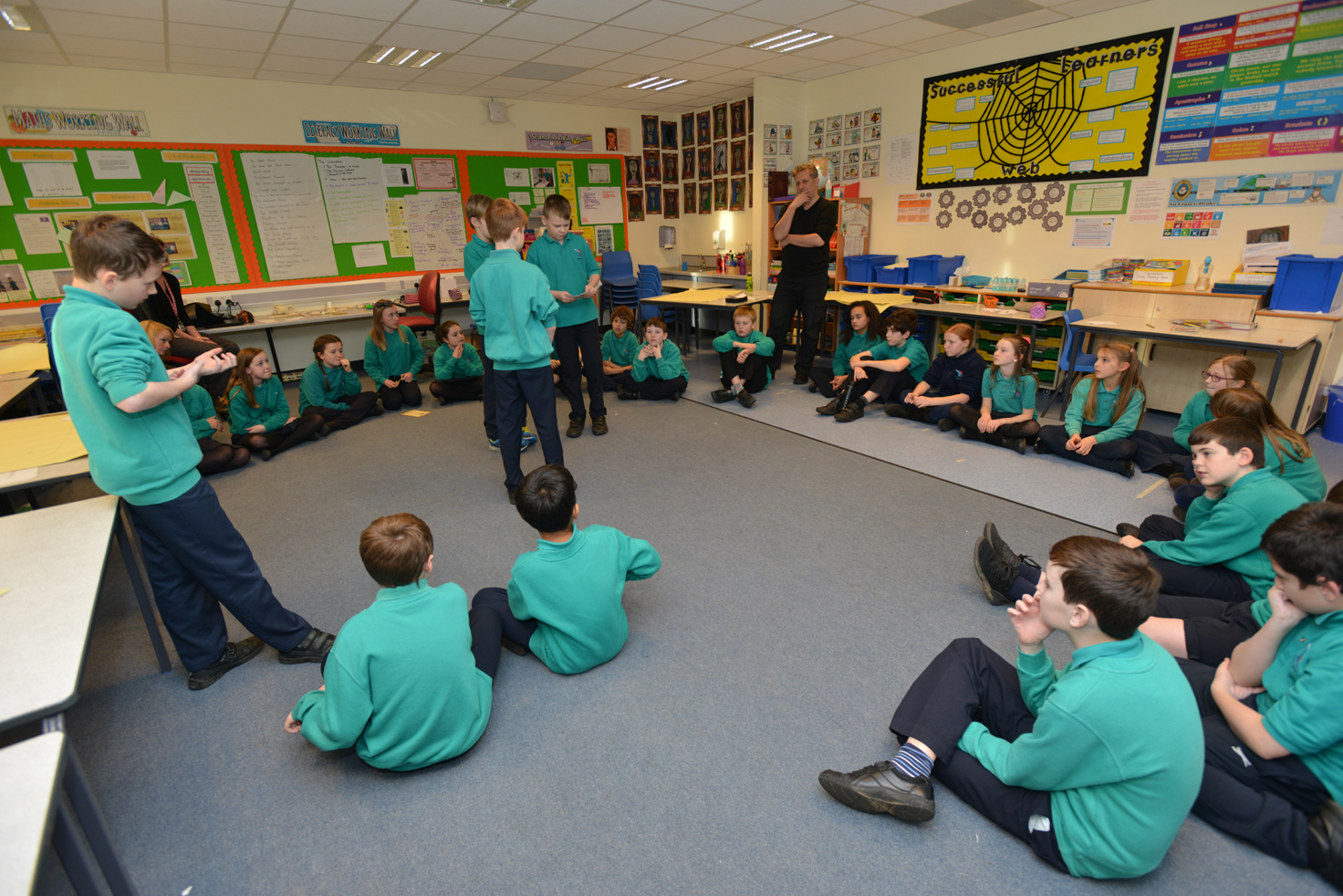
Using Heathcote's drama conventions, students explore why so many male passengers died during the sinking of the Titanic.

Mantle of the Expert functions by having the teacher design a fictional context where students assume the roles and responsibilities of an expert team. Within this framework, they are commissioned by a client to undertake a project that the teacher has planned. This project generates tasks and activities that facilitate studying and developing a wide range of curriculum areas.

From the outset, students understand they are participating in a fictional scenario. Mantle of the Expert is not a simulation intended to deceive students into believing the context is real. The approach involves students consciously entering and exiting the fiction, akin to imaginative play. They are aware that the fiction is a construct that can be paused and resumed at will. This process allows activities within the fiction to create a purpose for curriculum learning outside of it. For example, the teacher might introduce a task within the fiction, such as writing a report for a museum, and then step out of the story to teach the necessary skills and knowledge to complete the task. Once the task is finished, the fiction resumes, and students see the impact of their work within the fictional context. This cyclical process of entering and exiting the fictional narrative is a defining feature of the Mantle of the Expert approach..

The 'mantle' in Mantle of the Expert is metaphorical. It does not imply that students possess real-world expertise. Dorothy Heathcote emphasized that students are only experts within the fiction, taking on the roles and responsibilities of the team, but not outside of it. Within the fiction, both teacher and students collaborate as equals, sharing power and authority. Decisions are made collaboratively, reflecting distributed leadership. Outside the fiction, the teacher's authority remains intact.

Creating a fictional context where students can experiment with decision-making, responsibilities, and challenging situations provides a 'safe zone' within the classroom. Unlike the real world, where such experiences are rare for children, the fictional world allows them to explore, discuss, and evaluate these scenarios. Heathcote envisioned her ideal classroom as a laboratory, where students bring in their knowledge and assume the mantle of responsibility. The outcomes of their activities matter to someone beyond themselves, making these settings catalysts for societal change.."

== Elements ==
Tim Taylor in his book, "A Beginner's Guide to Mantle of the Expert" identifies nine elements to the Mantle of the Expert approach. These are:

1. The creation of a fictional context – planned by the teacher and developed in collaboration with the students. The main functions of the fictional context are to create wider opportunities for curriculum learning; to make curriculum learning meaningful and purposeful; and to engage the students in curriculum study.
2. The use of a narrative – planned by the teacher and developed in collaboration with the students. The main functions of the narrative are to set up the context for the students; to offer the students a way into the fiction; and to make curriculum activities memorable, understandable, and coherent.
3. The use of inquiry questions. The main functions of inquiry questions are for students to explore, study, and analyse the curriculum; for students and teachers to work together in a community of learning; and for the teacher to create opportunities for students to assess, rethink, and shape the direction of the work as it develops.
4. The Expert Team. Planned by the teacher and developed in collaboration with the students. Expert teams are people with authority, power, and status; people with responsibilities and duties to others; a community with agreed values and a defined purpose; colleagues with a shared history of challenges, mistakes, and success; experts with training and experience
5. The client. Planned by the teacher. The purpose of the client is to generate purposeful activities for the team; create a focus for the team; reflect back to the team how they are performing and what they need to do to improve and develop; assess and evaluate the work of the team, requiring high standards and a focus on the commission; provide information, specialist knowledge, and experiences; make demands of the team.
6. The commission. Planned by the teacher and developed with the students. The function of the commission is to give purpose to the work of the team and, by extension, to the students' curriculum studies; focus the work and keep it on course; provide a goal for the work, something to strive for; create a sense of responsibility; generate self-worth and a sense of achievement.
7. Different points view. The purpose of providing the students with different points of view is to look at events from multiple perspectives; provide alternative attitudes, values, and beliefs; generate opportunities for exploring people's motivations; challenge the student's views and orthodox thinking; create opportunities to explore people and events in depth and complexity; experiment with different ways of dealing with challenges and problems.
8. Tension. Planned by the teacher and developed in collaboration with the students. The purpose of tension is to create excitement and interest; create productive energy, drawing on the students' excitement and commitment to events; generate opportunities to examine people's actions, motivations, and values; build resilience.
9. Drama conventions. Planned by the teacher and used in collaboration with the students. The purpose of drama conventions is to play with time – hold it, rewind it, jump forward; create opportunities for exploration, examination, discussion, and reflection; investigate people's actions, motivations, and values; give students the power to influence events; create a 'safe zone' that gives students the opportunity to experiment and explore different possibilities and choices.

== Bibliography ==
- Aitken, V. (2021) Real in all the ways that Matter: Weaving Learning through the curriculum with Mantle of the Expert. NZCER Press.
- Viv Aitken, Dorothy Heathcote's Mantle of the Expert Approach to Teaching and Learning: a Brief Introduction. Ch.3 in Fraser, D. Aitken, V. and Whyte, B. (2013) Connecting Curriculum, Linking Learning. nzcer Press.
- Bolton, G. (2003) Dorothy Heathcote's Story: the biography of a remarkable drama teacher. London: Trentham Books.
- Bolton, G. (1999) Acting in Classroom Drama. Birmingham: Trentham Books.
- Edmiston, B. (2014) Transforming Teaching and Learning with Active and Dramatic Approaches: Engaging Students Across the Curriculum, Routledge.
- Heathcote, D. and Bolton, G. (1995) Drama for Learning: Dorothy Heathcote's mantle of the expert Approach to education. Portsmouth: Heinemann.
- Heathcote D. (2002) Contexts for Active Learning.
- Hesten, S. (1986) The Heathcote Archive. PhD thesis.
- Johnson, L. and O'Neill, C. (ed.) (1984) Dorothy Heathcote: Collected Writings on Education and Drama. London: Hutchinson.
- Morgan, N. and Saxton, J. (1987) Teaching Drama: a mind of many wonders. Portsmouth: Heinemann.
- O'Neill, C. (2015) Dorothy Heathcote on Education and Drama: Essential Writing. Routledge.
- Taylor, T. (2016) A Beginner's Guide to Mantle of the Expert. Singular. (Due for publication July 2016)
- Wagner, B.J. (1976) Dorothy Heathcote: Drama as a Learning Medium. London: Trentham Books.
