= Pit school =

A pit school was a covert school for African American children from the time when they were prevented from receiving an education due to repression and lack of freedom of assembly.

These schools were held at night. A pit would be dug and covered over.

A pit school is referred to in the book Nightjohn by Gary Paulsen.

== See also ==
- Black school
- Hedge school
