= Educational Technology & Society =

Peer-reviewed academic journal

- Discipline: Educational research
- Language: English
- Edited by: Maiga Chang, Andreas Harrer, Yu-Ju Lan, Yu-Fen Yang

Publication details
- History: 1998—present
- Publisher: National Taiwan Normal University on behalf of the International Forum of Educational Technology & Society (Taiwan)
- Frequency: Quarterly
- Open access: Yes
- License: CC BY-NC-ND 3.0
- Impact factor: 2.633 (2021)

Standard abbreviations
- ISO 4: Educ. Technol. Soc.

Indexing
- ISSN: 1176-3647 (print); 1436-4522 (web)
- LCCN: sn99023422
- JSTOR: 11763647
- OCLC no.: 42078529

Links
- Journal homepage; Online archive

Educational Technology & Society is a quarterly peer-reviewed open-access academic journal covering educational technology that was established in 1998. It is published by the National Taiwan Normal University on behalf of the International Forum of Educational Technology & Society. The editors-in-chief are Maiga Chang (Athabasca University), Andreas Harrer (Dortmund University of Applied Sciences and Arts), Yu-Ju Lan (National Taiwan Normal University), and Yu-Fen Yang (National Yunlin University of Science and Technology). The journal has no article processing charges.

== Abstracting and indexing ==
The journal is abstracted and indexed in:

- Current Contents/Social and Behavioral Sciences
- EBSCO databases
- ERIC
- Inspec
- PsycINFO
- Scopus
- Social Sciences Citation Index

According to the Journal Citation Reports, the journal has a 2021 impact factor of 2.633.
