= Teaching philosophy =

Prospective academic candidate's general personal views on teaching

The teaching philosophy of a candidate for an academic position, sometimes referred to as a teaching philosophy statement, is a written statement of the candidate's general personal views on teaching. Colleges and universities that advertise a position whose duties require teaching often require the applicant to submit a teaching philosophy with the application.

Teaching philosophy statements are becoming increasingly required in the attainment of teaching positions. Teaching philosophy statement often attempts to express what methods of teaching the candidate practices and what educational styles they intend to make use of. They are generally reviewed and updated as educators gain more experience to reflect their current views and beliefs.

"The Philosophy of Teaching" by Arnold Tompkins. Published in 1898, the book is an early example of teaching philosophy development.

== Content ==
The teaching philosophy can cover a substantial amount of material within a single page, which is a common length for the written statement (though longer statements, up to five pages, are acceptable in some cases). A writer may include their own teaching experiences or dedication to learning. They may also describe their beliefs around education, including the values they hold and models they intend to follow. Teaching philosophies often share why the individual wishes to teach, and what motivates them to pursue a career in education. Written teaching philosophies may be customized to be more specific to the field one intends to teach.

Written teaching philosophy statements may be informed by existing pedagogical research and theory; an early example of such a book is The Philosophy of Teaching by Arnold Tompkins. Books, articles, and research on pedagogy can offer a foundation upon which aspiring educators can form their own beliefs and values.

In a 1997/8 publication from The Professional & Organizational Development Network in Higher Education, Nancy Van Note Chism provided a description of the teaching philosophy statement. This description includes a general outline of what the document may include and in what order:

1. Conceptualization of Learning: How the candidate understands the process of learning
2. Conceptualization of Teaching: What the candidate sees as a teacher's role and why
3. Goals for Students: What the candidate expects of students in their classroom(s) in terms of learning and learning outcomes
4. Implementation and Assessment: How the candidate actually instructs classes, and how they self-assess their teaching
5. Your Future as a Successful Teacher/Personal Growth Plan: How the candidate's teaching has changed over time, and how they expect it may change. This can include challenges they foresee in their development, and assumptions or challenges they have overcome.
