= Exosomatic memory =

Memories recorded in physical form

Exosomatic memory is the recording of memories outside the brain. The earliest forms of symbolic behavior—scratching marks on bones—seem to be intended as exosomatic memory. However it was the invention of writing that allowed complex memories to be recorded.

A more narrow meaning of exosomatic memory is a computerized information system that interfaces directly with the brain and functions as an extension of the user memory. Such systems have been used as plot devices in numerous science fiction stories, especially among the cyberpunk genre. More recently, as scientific knowledge of neurology improves, some such as Gregory B. Newby are suggesting that such a device may be possible.

This is a central concept in the philosophy of technics of Bernard Stiegler.

== See also ==
- Brain–computer interface
