= Cross-registration =

Academic administration in the United States

Cross-registration in United States higher education is a system allowing students at one university, college, or faculty within a university to take individual courses for credit at another institution or faculty, typically in the same region.

Cross-registration gives students access to a wider variety of subject matter at a certain logistical cost: travel time, inconsistent academic calendars, etc. It is governed by the home institution's regulations, which typically require that a similar course not be offered by the home institution, that the student not take too many outside courses, that certain basic types of courses be taken at the home institution, etc.

Among institutions, cross-registration is governed by agreements – bilateral or regional (often consortia). Money may or may not flow between the institutions to compensate for the difference between inbound and outbound cross-registrants. Cross-registration allows universities in a region to focus on their area of specialization at the cost of not having direct control of their students' academic experience.
