= Creative services =

Service providing creative ideas and/or creative works to others

Creative services are a subsector of the creative industries, a part of the economy that creates wealth by offering creativity for hire to other businesses. Creative Services also means a department within a company that does creative work such as writing, designing, and production. It is often a sub-department of the Marketing organization. Examples include:

- Design and production agencies
  - Studios
  - Ideation consultancies
  - Software development firms
- Marketing firms
  - Public relations agencies
  - Advertising agencies
  - Promotional agencies
  - Branding agencies
- Entertainment Industries
  - Talent agency
  - Guilds

Like lawyers and accountants in the professional services sector, creative services firms sell a specialised technical service to satisfy the needs of companies that do not have this expertise themselves.

Creative services firms provide creative services to other companies or to the public: they 'do creativity' to order.

Typical business models revolve around selling the time of skilled professionals, either on a project-by-project basis or through a service level agreement, and providing services on an ongoing basis for a fixed monthly fee. In this sense they share much in common with professional services firms but there are also key differences:

- Creative services firms tend not to be bound by requirements for professional accreditation
- There are low barriers to entry for new startup businesses
