= Course equivalency =

Course equivalency is the term used in higher education describing how a course offered by one college or university relates to a course offered by another. If a course at one institution is viewed as equal or more challenging in subject and course material than a course offered at another institution, the first course can be noted as an equivalent course of the second one. A course equivalency can be unilateral, meaning it is deemed equivalent by the institution where a petitioner hopes to get credit for a course taken elsewhere. Or, it could be bilateral, meaning both institutions acknowledge their acceptance of each other's course as equivalent. The methods and measures used to determine course equivalency vary by institution, state, region and country.

== Background ==
College transfer often requires the determination and evaluation of prior course learning. Receiving institutions usually maintain course equivalency tables listing how courses equate by sender institution. Unless the receiving institution maintains an online public reference to the course equivalency tables, students have difficulty ascertaining transferability of their credit experiences. As a result, student transitions from sender to receiver can be very problematic. This has led a number of states to initiate legislate reforms, regulations and mandates to augment the tracking of course equivalencies. A variety of statistics, studies, and initiatives have been documented (see References).

The most common course attributes evaluated to determine course equivalency are description, academic credits, accreditation, type of instructor, method of instruction, level of instruction, learning outcomes, grade scale and grade earned, pre-requisites, co-requisites and textbook. This is not an exclusive list of course attributes. Generally, faculty perform the determination of course equivalencies. Course equivalency decisions can often be appealed by presenting evidence to an academic department.

== See also ==
- College transfer
- Articulation (education)
- Career college
- Community college
- Junior college
- University
- List of colleges and universities
