= National Diploma =

A National Diploma is a title that is used to represent a standard of academic or vocational education. The title was first used in the United Kingdom, but has now been adopted by educational systems worldwide.

- National Diploma (Ireland), a three-year ab initio specialised higher education qualification in a technology discipline
- National Diploma (Mauritius)
- National Diploma (New Zealand)
- National Diploma (Nigeria)
- National Diploma (South Africa)
- National Diploma (Sri Lanka)
- National Diploma (United Kingdom), a standard academic qualification offered by most colleges and universities in the United Kingdom
