= Prison Mathematics Project =

American prison non-profit

- Abbreviation: PMP
- Established: 2020; 6 years ago (Note: The PMP was incorporated in 2020, although Havens started the PMP as a project at his prison in 2016.)
- Founders: Christopher Havens; Walker Blackwell
- Type: 501(c)(3) non-profit
- Tax ID no.: 85-4162338
- Purpose: Mathematics education and research in US prisons
- Executive director: Ben Jeffers
- Website: prisonmathproject.org

The Prison Mathematics Project (PMP) is an American prison education organization that promotes the study of mathematics. It pairs prisoners who have an interest in mathematics with outside mentors. Participants may be of any skill level, with some working towards a certificate of High School Equivalency and others performing original research. It also prepares learning materials and holds Pi Day events at prisons. It is not a credit-earning prison-to-college program, although participants may be simultaneously engaged in such programs. Its founder, Christopher Havens, began studying mathematics while in solitary confinement, and founded the organization while still incarcerated. Stated goals of the PMP include reducing recidivism and challenging stereotypes about prisoners.

In 2022 the PMP had 450 volunteers, who worked with 171 prisoners in 27 states. As of December 2025, the PMP had over 350 participants in the mentorship program, with more attending in-person events such as Math Circles and Pi Day.

== History ==
In 2010, Havens and an accomplice shot and killed a man within the Capitol State Forest near Olympia, Washington over a drug-related dispute. A high-school dropout, he had been addicted to drugs, and mostly homeless throughout his adult life. Havens was convicted of murder in 2011 and sentenced to 25 years in prison. He became involved with prison gangs and, after an altercation with another prisoner, was placed in solitary confinement for a one-year period.

Havens recalled idolizing cryptographers in spy movies during his childhood, comparing them to Gandalf. In solitary, Havens started doing sudoku puzzles to pass the time, and then received a packet of math problems. He became "hooked", staying up late solving problems, and began teaching himself basic mathematics. He said during this time he spent 10 hours a day studying mathematics, while also taking part in an "Intensive Transition Program". Having finished the program and exhausted the resources available at the prison library, in 2013 Havens wrote to Mathematical Sciences Publishers to request information about subscribing to the Annals of Mathematics and about mathematicians with whom he could correspond. A mathematics professor at the University of Torino in Italy, Umberto Cerruti, agreed to mail Havens a problem to solve. Havens mailed back a 4 feet (1.2 m)-long sheet of paper with a single lengthy formula. Cerruti suspected Havens was a crackpot, but the formula turned out to be correct, and Cerruti began discussing a problem in continued fractions with Havens. Cerruti sent math books to Havens, but they were blocked until Havens negotiated with the prison administration. Their collaboration culminated in a paper published in Research in Number Theory in January 2020. In May 2020, his daughter Marta Cerruti (a professor of engineering at McGill University) wrote an article for The Conversation about Havens. The article went viral, attracting international media attention and a mention in The College Mathematics Journal.

After moving to minimum security in 2015, Havens sought ways to share his transformative experience studying mathematics. Biweekly meetings with other prisoners in his prison were the beginning of the PMP. In 2017 he organized the first Pi Day at Monroe Correctional Complex, with Cerruti and two other professors of math in attendance. A Texas teenager who had read about Havens online, Walker Blackwell, began exchanging messages with him. At first Havens was apprehensive about working with Blackwell, and made Blackwell ensure that his parents were aware of their conversations. Blackwell convinced Havens to extend PMP's activities to other prisons before his own release, and the two incorporated the Prison Mathematics Program as a non-profit in 2020. At the time, Havens was completing an associate degree by mail through Adams State University. Blackwell left the project during college and was later named a recipient of the 2025–2027 Voyager Scholarship from the Obama Foundation.

Havens began studying computation theory with Amit Sahai, who is also an advisor to the PMP. Initially, the PMP set up a cloud-based service called the "PMP Console", with which Havens and other participants could send computer code to an email address and it would return the results. Drawbacks to this system included transactional charges for sending emails from prison and restrictions against sending coded messages. At the time, prison technology firm Securus Technologies was exploring adding a console-like feature to its education app. PMP then developed an app, CodePraxis, for JPay and Global Tel Link tablet computers. It gives prisoners access to Python, JavaScript, and LaTeX environments, and provides a series of courses. It was given a trial run at the Clarence Correctional Centre in Australia, and as of November 2025, was soon to be launched at the Maine Correctional Center.

In December 2025, the Clemency and Pardons Board unanimously recommended that Havens' sentence be commuted; however, governor of Washington Bob Ferguson decided against clemency.
