= Martin Lee Sanders =

American serial killer and rapist (1952–2022)

- Born: May 31, 1952; Montana, U.S.
- Died: April 4, 2022 (aged 69); Coyote Ridge Corrections Center, Connell, Washington, U.S.
- Occupation: Truck driver
- Status: Deceased
- Convictions: Kidnapping; Assault; Rape; Murder (×2)
- Penalty: Life imprisonment

Details
- Victims: 4
- Span of crimes: 1980–1983
- States: Montana, Washington
- Date apprehended: April 2, 1987

Martin Lee Sanders (May 31, 1952 – April 4, 2022) was an American serial killer and rapist. A truck driver, Sanders kidnapped and murdered two young women near Ephrata, Washington, in 1980, followed by two teenage girls in Spokane in 1983. He was convicted of the latter killings in 1990, with the court agreeing to not prosecute him in the 1980 murders, and Sanders was sentenced to life imprisonment.

== Murders ==
=== Marsha Weatter and Kathy Allen ===
The first two victims were Marsha Weatter, 18, and Kathy Allen, 19. Formerly of Fairbanks, Alaska, the two women began hitchhiking across the Western United States in 1980, but made promises to their parents saying they would be home by April 6, 1980. They were last seen in March 1980 at a restaurant in Ritzville, Washington. By May, with no new sightings of the women, the parents hired investigators to try and locate them.

With no leads, sheriff's detectives brought Rev. Robert William Reid to Washington. Reid claimed that through spiritual connections he concluded the women had been abducted. On October 10, 1981, the bodies of Weatter and Allen were found along Interstate 90 in Washington, covered in several inches of ash from the May 18, 1980 eruption of Mount St. Helens, and they were concluded to have been shot to death.

=== Rhonda Rima and Elizabeth Marks ===
In May 1983, Rhonda Rima and Elizabeth Marks, two 15-year-old girls, were last seen at the Lilac Festival carnival in Spokane, Washington. Three weeks after their disappearances, their bodies were discovered in the Spokane River.

== Arrest ==
On May 18, 1986, Sanders, using an unloaded gun and handcuffs, kidnapped two hitchhikers in Missoula, Montana. He raped one of the victims in the sleeping compartment of his semi-truck. He was arrested in Wyoming on April 2, 1987, and was extradited to Montana to face kidnapping charges. He was soon arrested for this crime and sentenced to 20 years in prison the following year.

Sanders became a suspect in the murders in 1989 after he confessed to his cellmate about the murders of Rima and Marks, revealing details about the murders that only the perpetrator would know. The inmate told authorities about Sanders' confession, and Sanders was extradited to Washington to face trial the next year. In order to avoid the death penalty, he pleaded guilty, along with admitting involvement in the murders of Weatter and Allen, and received a life sentence which he was serving at the Coyote Ridge Correctional Center, Connell, Washington. He died of a heart attack on April 4, 2022, while incarcerated at Coyote Ridge.

== See also ==
- Crime in Washington (state)
- Trucking industry in the United States
- List of serial killers in the United States
