= List of Washington state prisons =

This is a list of state prisons in Washington housing adult inmates administered by the Washington State Department of Corrections (WADOC). It does not include county jails, or juvenile facilities located in Washington.

== Current prisons ==
The department currently operates 11 adult prisons (9 male institutions and 2 female institutions). The department confines nearly 13,000 offenders in these facilities, with each varying in size and mission across the state.

| Facility | Location | Year opened | Major facility | Population gender | Capacity | Custody level(s) |
|---|---|---|---|---|---|---|
| Airway Heights Corrections Center (AHCC) | Airway Heights | 1992 | Yes | Male | 2,258 | MI-2; MI-3; Medium |
| Cedar Creek Corrections Center (CCCC) | Littlerock | 1954 | No | Male | 480 | MI-2 |
| Clallam Bay Corrections Center (CBCC) | Clallam Bay | 1985 | Yes | Male | 858 | Medium; Close; Maximum |
| Coyote Ridge Corrections Center (CRCC) | Connell | 1992 | Yes | Male | 2,468 | MI-2; MI-3; Medium |
| Monroe Correctional Complex (MCC) | Monroe | 1910 | Yes | Male | 3,100 | MI-2; MI-3; Medium; Close; Maximum |
| Olympic Corrections Center (OCC) | Forks | 1968 | No | Male | 381 | MI-2 |
| Stafford Creek Corrections Center (SCCC) | Aberdeen | 2000 | Yes | Male | 1,936 | MI-3; Medium; Maximum |
| Washington Corrections Center (WCC) | Shelton | 1964 | Yes | Male | 1,268 | Medium; Close; Maximum |
| Washington Corrections Center for Women (WCCW) | Gig Harbor | 1971 | Yes | Female | 738 | MI-2; MI-3; Medium; Close |
| Washington State Penitentiary (WSP) | Walla Walla | 1886 | Yes | Male | 2,439 | MI-2; MI-3; Medium; Close; Maximum |

== Closed prisons ==
The following prisons are no longer in operation or are not actively holding Incarcerated Individuals by the Department of Corrections.

| Facility | Location | Year opened | Year closed | Major facility | Population gender | Capacity | Custody level(s) |
|---|---|---|---|---|---|---|---|
| Ahtanum View Corrections Center (AVCC) | Yakima | 1997 | 2010 | No | Male | 120 | Assisted Living; MI-2 |
| Larch Corrections Center (LCC) | Yacolt | 1956 | 2023 | No | Male | 240 | MI-2 |
| McNeil Island Corrections Center (MICC) | Steilacoom | 1875* | 2011 | Yes | Male | 853 | Medium |
| Mission Creek Corrections Center for Women (MCCCW) | Belfair | 2005 | 2025 | No | Female | 321 | MI-2 |
| Pine Lodge Corrections Center for Women (PLCCW) | Medical Lake | 1979 | 2010 | No | Female | 359 | MI-2 |

- McNeil Island was opened in 1875 by the U.S. government as a federal penitentiary. WSDOC signed a lease in 1981 to use the island, which was officially deeded to the State of Washington in 1984.
