= R(89)12 =

Recommendation

The Council of Europe adopted a recommendation on prison education on October 13, 1989, at the 429th meeting of the Ministers Deputies under the terms of article 15.b of the Statutes of the Council of Europe. The Recommendation on Education in Prison is written in a 54 pages memorandum. The essence of the memorandum is given as 17 recommendations, that forms the basis for European education in Prisons.

The recommendations led to the formation of the European Prison Education Association, EPEA.

== Recommendation R(89) 12 ==
COUNCIL OF EUROPE RECOMMENDATION No. R(89)12 OF THE COMMITTEE OF MINISTERS TO MEMBER STATES ON EDUCATION IN PRISON

(adopted by the Committee of Ministers on 13 October 1989at the 429th meeting of the Ministers' Deputies)

The Committee of Ministers, under the terms of Article 15.b of the Statute of the Council of Europe -

- Considering that the right to education is fundamental;
- Considering the importance of education in the development of the individual and the community;
- Realising in particular that a high proportion of prisoners have had very little successful educational experience, and therefore now have many educational needs;
- Considering that education in prison helps to humanise prisons and to improve the conditions of detention;
- Considering that education in prison is an important way of facilitating the return of the prisoner to the community;
- Recognising that in the practical application of certain rights or measures, in accordance with the following recommendations, distinctions may be justified between convicted prisoners and prisoners remanded in custody;

Having regard to Recommendation No. R(87)3 on the European Prison Rules and Recommendation No. R(81)17 on Adult Education Policy,

- recommends the governments of member States to implement policies which recognise the following:

1) All prisoners shall have access to education, which is envisaged as consisting of classroom subjects, vocational education, creative and cultural activities, physical education and sports, social education and library facilities;

2) Education for prisoners should be like the education provided for similar age groups in the outside world, and the range of learning opportunities for prisoners should be as wide as possible;

3) Education in prison shall aim to develop the whole person bearing in mind his or her social, economic and cultural context;

4) All those involved in the administration of the prison system and the management of prisons should facilitate and support education as much as possible;

5) Education should have no less a status than work within the prison regime and prisoners should not lose out financially or otherwise by taking part in education;

6) Every effort should be made to encourage the prisoner to participate actively in all aspects of education;

7) Development programmes should be provided to ensure that prison educators adopt appropriate adult education methods;

8) Special attention should be given to those prisoners with particular difficulties and especially those with reading or writing problems;

9) Vocational education should aim at the wider development of the individual, as well as being sensitive to trends in the labour market;

10) Prisoners should have direct access to a well-stocked library at least once per week;

11) Physical education and sports for prisoners should be emphasised and encouraged;

12) Creative and cultural activities should be given a significant role because these activities have particular potential to enable prisoners to develop and express themselves;

13) Social education should include practical elements that enable the prisoner to manage daily life within the prison, with a view to facilitating the return to society;

14) Wherever possible, prisoners should be allowed to participate in education outside prison;

15) Where education has to take place within the prison, the outside community should be involved as fully as possible;

16) Measures should be taken to enable prisoners to continue their education after release;

17) The funds, equipment and teaching staff needed to enable prisoners to receive appropriate education should be made available.
