= Ahtanum View Corrections Center =

Convalescent hospital for convicts in Washington, US

Ahtanum View Corrections Center (AVCC)
- Location in Washington
- Location: Yakima, Washington; 46°34′8″N 120°35′37″W
- Status: Closed
- Security class: Minimum, Assisted Living
- Capacity: 120
- Opened: 1997
- Closed: 2010
- Managed by: Washington State Department of Corrections (1997–2010)

Ahtanum View Corrections Center was a convalescent hospital for inmates operated by the Washington State Department of Corrections. Located in Yakima, Washington, the facility was classified as a minimum security prison with capacity for 120 inmates who required medical assistance or long-term treatment, including age or intensive healthcare. It opened in July 1997 at the former Yakima County tuberculosis sanitarium and also housed a work release facility with 60 beds.

The unisex facility was established to reduce capacity issues at infirmaries at higher-security prisons in a cost-effective manner for lower-risk inmates. The two-story building was purchased by the state government in 1993 and renovated at a cost of $6.5 million. It had dorms instead of cells and outdoor areas that inmates were allowed to freely roam. A private sweat lodge was constructed in the courtyard for Native American inmates. Ahtanum View was one of two facilities proposed for closure in 2009 by the state government due to budget issues and the high per-inmate cost for the facility. The facility closed permanently in February 2010. Most inmates were transferred to other prison infirmaries or to a newly-expanded medical housing unit at Coyote Ridge Corrections Center in Connell, Washington. The 60-bed work release facility adjacent to the convalescent hospital remained open.
