= Gary Grant (serial killer) =

Convicted American serial killer

- Born: Gary Gene Grant; June 29, 1951 (age 75); Renton, Washington, U.S.
- Conviction: First degree murder (4 counts)
- Penalty: Life imprisonment

Details
- Victims: 4
- Span of crimes: 1969–1971
- Country: United States
- State: Washington
- Date apprehended: April 30, 1971
- Imprisoned at: Monroe Correctional Complex, Monroe, Washington

Gary Gene Grant (born June 29, 1951) is an American serial killer who raped and murdered four young people in Renton, Washington, between 1969 and 1971. At the start of the murders, he was only 18 years old, with three of his victims being children under the age of 17. On August 25, 1971, Grant was convicted of murder and sentenced to life imprisonment. He denied his guilt in the crimes, claiming that he is insane.

== Biography ==
Gary Grant was born on June 29, 1951, in Renton, spending his childhood and adolescence in poverty. His parents were engaged in low-skilled labor, had financial difficulties and lived in a trailer park on the city's outskirts. Gary's mother was an alcoholic, and due to this, the young man often had to watch his parents fight. In his teenage years, he was often mentally overstrained and stressed out, losing all interest in education and avoiding school altogether. He dropped out of school in the mid-1960s. Near the end of the decade, he signed up for the Army and was assigned to the Navy. At the very beginning of his service, however, he was bullied by other marines, developing signs of mental illness. He refused further service, citing health reasons, and was dismissed from the Army a few months later. Following this, Grant returned to Renton, where a wave of murders soon started.

== Murders ==
On the evening of December 15, 1969, Grant attacked 19-year-old Carol Adele Erickson, a student at Renton Technical College. She was heading home from the Renton Municipal Library along a dirt road running parallel to the Cedar River. During the attack, Gary stabbed the girl with a knife and then dragged her body into nearby bushes, where he had sex with her corpse. After he was finished, Gary physically abused the corpse, leaving lacerations on Erickson's neck. Her body was found the following day on the banks of the Cedar River.

On September 20, 1970, Grant attacked 17-year-old Joanne Mary Zulauf, a student at Hazen High School. She had left the house for a walk before dinnertime, telling her mother that she would be back in 10 minutes. A neighbor walking their dog saw Joanne around 5 p.m. Grant hit her on the head with a stone, and then dragged her into the woods, where he raped and strangled her. Joanne's mother reported her missing at 10:30 p.m. the same evening, but the police responded to the call the following evening. Her nude body was found on September 22, half a mile from her home in Renton. Four days after the murder, Grant gave his girlfriend a wristwatch he had pocketed from the body as a gift for her birthday.

On April 20, 1971, Grant committed his final murders. While passing by a house, he saw two 6-year-old boys, Scott Andrews and Bradley Lyons, playing outside. He threatened the boys with a knife and took them into the woods about two kilometers away from the Bradleys' residence. He beat the children up and then stabbed Andrews and strangled Lyons. After killing the boys, he covered the bodies with leaves and branches. The bodies were found two days later. While examining the crime scene, investigators found footprints of the offender's tennis shoes, of which plaster casts were taken.

== Investigation and arrest ==
On April 28, 1971, search teams found a hunting knife with dried blood stains, about 50 meters from the crime scene. After examining it at the laboratory, it was found that the bloodstains matched Scott Andrews' blood type. The knife had the name "Tom Evenson" engraved on the handle. In the following hours, Evenson was located and interrogated. During the interrogation, Evenson claimed that he had sold the knife to his friend, Jerry Triplett. The next day, Triplett was questioned and he said that he had also sold the knife; to a friend, Jim Monger. Like the previous two, Monger was found and questioned. Monger told the officers that he had lent the knife to Gary Grant. Authorities detained Grant in his trailer on April 30, 1971, and subsequently took him in for questioning. During the interviews, Gary was unable to provide an alibi for the day of the boys' murders. He first stated that he suffered from amnesia and then burst into tears, confessing to the killings.

On the following day, in the presence of his father and his lawyer, Grant confessed to all four murders and explained how they had occurred. Because Renton Police Captain, William G. Frazee, had illegally installed recording devices in the interrogation room, Grant's lawyers filed a motion to drop all charges against their client in June 1971, claiming that his constitutional rights had been violated. On June 30, the appeal was rejected due to the fact that Gary's confession had been previously recorded legally on the day of his arrest. Frazee was charged with wiretapping and subsequently suspended from the police force.

== Trial ==
Grant's trial began on August 12, 1971. The main pieces of evidence incriminating him were an audio recording of his confession, a blood-stained knife and imprints from his tennis shoes, the size and treads of whose soles matched the shoes Grant was wearing at the time of his arrest. During subsequent hearings, a number of acquaintances acted as witnesses for the prosecution, telling the jury that they had seen Gary on the days of the murders near the crime scenes, and that he had dirty clothes. Gary's lawyers, in turn, insisted on their client's insanity and demanded leniency. His close friends and father acted as witnesses for the defense, stating that since childhood Grant was a passive, harmless individual. At the request of his defense team, a forensic psychiatric exam was conducted to evaluate Grant's mental health. Based on the results from said exam, he was found to be sane, although the psychiatrist noted that Gary was impulsive, had problems controlling himself and often acted out emotionally in high-stress situations. He also suggested that the crimes were his way of escapism, used as a way to vent his frustrations at unresolved personal issues. After a two-day meeting on August 25, the jury verdict was announced: Gary Grant was found guilty on all counts. He was sentenced to four life terms without parole after the jury voted against a death sentence.

== Aftermath ==
Since his conviction, Grant has been imprisoned at various Washington State penitentiaries.

In 2020, he received a second wave of infamy after author Cloyd Steiger published his book Seattle's Forgotten Serial Killer: Gary Gene Grant, which revealed new details about the case.

As of December 2020, the 69-year-old Grant is alive and serving his sentence at the Monroe Correctional Complex, under the ID number 127688.

== See also ==
- List of serial killers in the United States
