= 2008 Skagit County shootings =

Spree shooting in Washington, U.S.

- Location: Skagit County, Washington, U.S.: Alger; Interstate 5
- Date: September 2, 2008; 2:15 – 4:30 p.m.
- Attack type: Spree shooting; shootout; mass murder; mass shooting; killing spree
- Weapons: Winchester Lever-action rifle; Handgun
- Deaths: 6
- Injuries: 4 (1 stabbed)
- Perpetrator: Isaac Zamora
- Motive: Mental illness

On September 2, 2008, 28-year-old Isaac Zamora killed six people (including one sheriff's deputy) and wounded two more on a shooting rampage in Skagit County, Washington, United States. The incident began when Skagit County Sheriff's Deputy Anne Jackson responded to a call at Zamora's home in Alger. Zamora shot Jackson and then left the residence. He shot seven additional people and led authorities on a high-speed chase along Interstate 5 before surrendering at the Skagit County Sheriff's Office in Mount Vernon, Washington.

== Shooting ==
On the evening of September 2, Alger, Washington, resident Isaac Zamora had gone into a neighbor's house, stealing their rifle and shotgun. Isaac Zamora's mother, Dennise Zamora, called police around 2:15 p.m. in response to the trespassing. Skagit County Sheriff's Deputy Anne Jackson arrived to the scene, where Isaac Zamora shot and killed her. Deputies responded to reports of gunfire, and they arrived to find Jackson and another person dead at the scene. Zamora killed three other people and wounded two others in Alger. After the Alger shootings, Zamora raced south on Interstate 5 at speeds near 90 miles per hour while troopers, sheriff's deputies, and Mount Vernon police pursued him. During the chase, Zamora shot Trooper Troy Giddings, who drove himself to a hospital and was released afterwards. A motorcyclist at a Shell gas station was injured after being shot, and another man, Leroy Lange, was killed after being shot while riding south in his SUV. Around 4:30 p.m., Zamora drove into the parking lot of the Skagit County Sheriff's Office in Mount Vernon, where he surrendered. He was arrested and booked in Mount Vernon Jail.

== Perpetrator ==
Isaac Zamora had a history of mental health problems, and a criminal record. Dennise Zamora said Isaac had first experienced mental health issues when their family's house burned down a decade before. He was living in the woods on and off for years, and working as a house painter. He had grown "increasingly despondent" after breaking up with his girlfriend and being injured while painting a house. He then became addicted to painkillers. He moved into a trailer on the Zamora family property in Alger. Dennise said she had tried to get help for Zamora multiple times. Deputy Jackson had tried to help the Zamora family in the past and told Dennise to call her anytime for help. For six months in 2008, Zamora had served a jail sentence in the county for felony drug possession. He was released on August 6. As a part of his sentence, after Zamora was released, he was supposed to undergo a mental health evaluation. He couldn't afford one, and his corrections officers were working on getting him one. The corrections officer assigned to Zamora did not know Zamora was keeping guns in his trailer, which would have been an arrestable offense. Zamora's last report to his corrections officer was on August 21.

== Aftermath ==
Washington Governor Christine Gregoire called for an independent review into how Zamora's criminal cases were handled. At his 2009 trial, Zamora pled guilty to several felony charges, including four counts of aggravated murder, in the shootings, and not guilty by reason of insanity to two additional counts of aggravated murder. Zamora received four life sentences and was subsequently committed to Western State Hospital. In 2012, Zamora was moved to the Monroe Correctional Complex due to concerns that his presence posed a threat to hospital staff and other patients. As of October 2019, Zamora was appealing for a new trial. In November 2019, judge Dave Needy denied his request.

In 2013, the state of Washington paid $9 million to settle lawsuits from the victims' families who claimed more could have been done to prevent the shooting.

== Victims ==
- Chester Malcolm Rose, aged 58
- Deputy Anne Jackson, aged 40
- Julie Ann Binschus, aged 48
- David Thomas Radcliffe, aged 57
- Gregory Neil Gillum, aged 38
- Leroy B. Lange, aged 64

- Richard Treston (stabbed)
- Fred Binschus (wounded)
- Ben Mercado (wounded)
- Troy Giddings (wounded)

== See also ==
- List of rampage killers in the United States
