= Olympic Corrections Center =

Minimum security prison in Washington

Olympic Corrections Center (OCC)
- Location in Washington
- Location: Forks; 47°43′09″N 124°08′11″W
- Status: Operational
- Security class: Minimum 2/Camp
- Capacity: 272
- Opened: 1968
- Managed by: Washington State Department of Corrections
- Warden: Scott Speer, Superintendent
- Website: www.doc.wa.gov/corrections/incarceration/prisons/occ.htm

The Olympic Corrections Center is located in Jefferson County, west of Olympic National Park. It is within the service area of the Forks, Washington, post office, even though it is not close to that city. It is a minimum security facility. Inmates there often work fighting forest fires during the summer, assisting the Department of Natural Resources in clearing and planting trees.

Speciality Inmate crews supervised by Custody and Corrections Officers also help the local communities by providing yard work at senior centers, paint schools (during summer when the children are absent), and other services in the vicinity of the facility.

On October 31, 2011, authorities at Olympic CC entered into a contract with McDougall & Sons orchard in Quincy, Grant County to use 105 inmates to pick apples for that company. McDougall agreed to pay corrections officials $22.00 per hour per inmate for the labor.

The camp is located in Jefferson County, on Hoh Mainline Road north of Clearwater, Washington.

== See also ==
- List of law enforcement agencies in Washington (state)
- List of United States state correction agencies
- List of U.S. state prisons
- List of Washington state prisons
