= Prison literacy =

Reading and writing education in prisons

Prison literacy refers to any educational activity process or methodology within the prison education system designed to encourage inmates to develop foundational skills relating to reading and writing. While standard prison education often focuses on basic functional skills, contemporary research heavily focuses on the intersection of literacy, power structures, and individual agency.

== Pre-incarceration context ==
=== Literacy as a civil right ===
Scholars argue that the systematic denial of meaningful, high-quality literacy education within public schools serves a primary mechanism for underrepresentation and inequality. Within this framework, literacy is defined as a civil rights issue rather than purely an academic skill. Proponents argue that suppressing critical thinking of a student's voice early within education effectively silences marginalized youth, which renders them more vulnerable to subsequent incarceration.

=== School-to-prison pipeline ===
Both educational and legal scholars analyze the school-to-prison-pipeline to describe how school policies have systematically channeled marginalized youth out of public educational institutions and into juvenile and adult legal systems. Research within this field has indicated that typical disciplinary frameworks, such as zero-tolerance policies, have become large pathways to criminalization by shifting disciplinary infractions to the responsibility of law enforcement. Because of this, a significantly large amount of underserved communities and racial demographics are specifically targeted.

== Theoretical frameworks ==
=== Critical pedagogy ===
Critical pedagogy is a foundational educational theory by Paulo Freire and Donaldo Macedo in which literacy is used as a tool for social and political empowerment. They argue that reading and literacy skills cannot be separated from understanding and critically analyzing the world. In both pre-carceral and carceral contexts, critical pedagogy emphasizes giving learners the proper analytical tools in order to evaluate and critique the power structures, institutional policies, and social structures surrounding inmates' lives.

== Pedagogical practices ==
=== Creative writing ===
Creative writing workshops have been used inside adult correctional facilities to foster individual autonomy and privacy. Ethnographic research within carceral systems, such as the state prison in Oaxaca, indicates that the use of poetry and short-story composition creates a "pedagogical safe house" wherein inmates are free to express critical thinking away from prison authorities. Researchers have found that through these practices, incarcerated individuals are allowed to construct "imagined spaces" beyond prison walls. These spaces allow incarcerated individuals to challenge traditional institutional hierarchies by combating the dynamics of geopolitical knowledge and cross post-colonial borders.

=== Lyrical composition ===
Lyrical writing serves as an alternative modality for creative literacy and emotional processing within carceral institutions. Qualitative studies of songwriting workshops within the United States medium-security facilities demonstrated how collaborative musical composition allowed supportive peer environments and counteracted the pressures of institutionalization. Engaging in lyrical composition allowed participants of the study to experience deep cognitive states of flow, process emotional trauma, and navigate personal themes of relationships and social adjustment.

== Systematic challenges ==
Integration of alternative literacy practices within state and federal educational networks often faces significant resistance. Policy network analysis into federal education initiatives indicate that radical critiques are frequently co-opted by dominant policy actors. Research suggests that systematic educational and carceral reforms are regularly commodified into standardized, data-tracking behavioral management products (such as Positive Behavioral Interventions and Supports, PBIS). Critics argue that the commercialization of critical pedagogical workshops inversely prioritizes institutional order and measurable compliance rather than genuine social transformation and true agency.

== See also ==
- Books to Prisoners
- Prison literature
- Prison library
