= Prison-to-college programs in the United States =

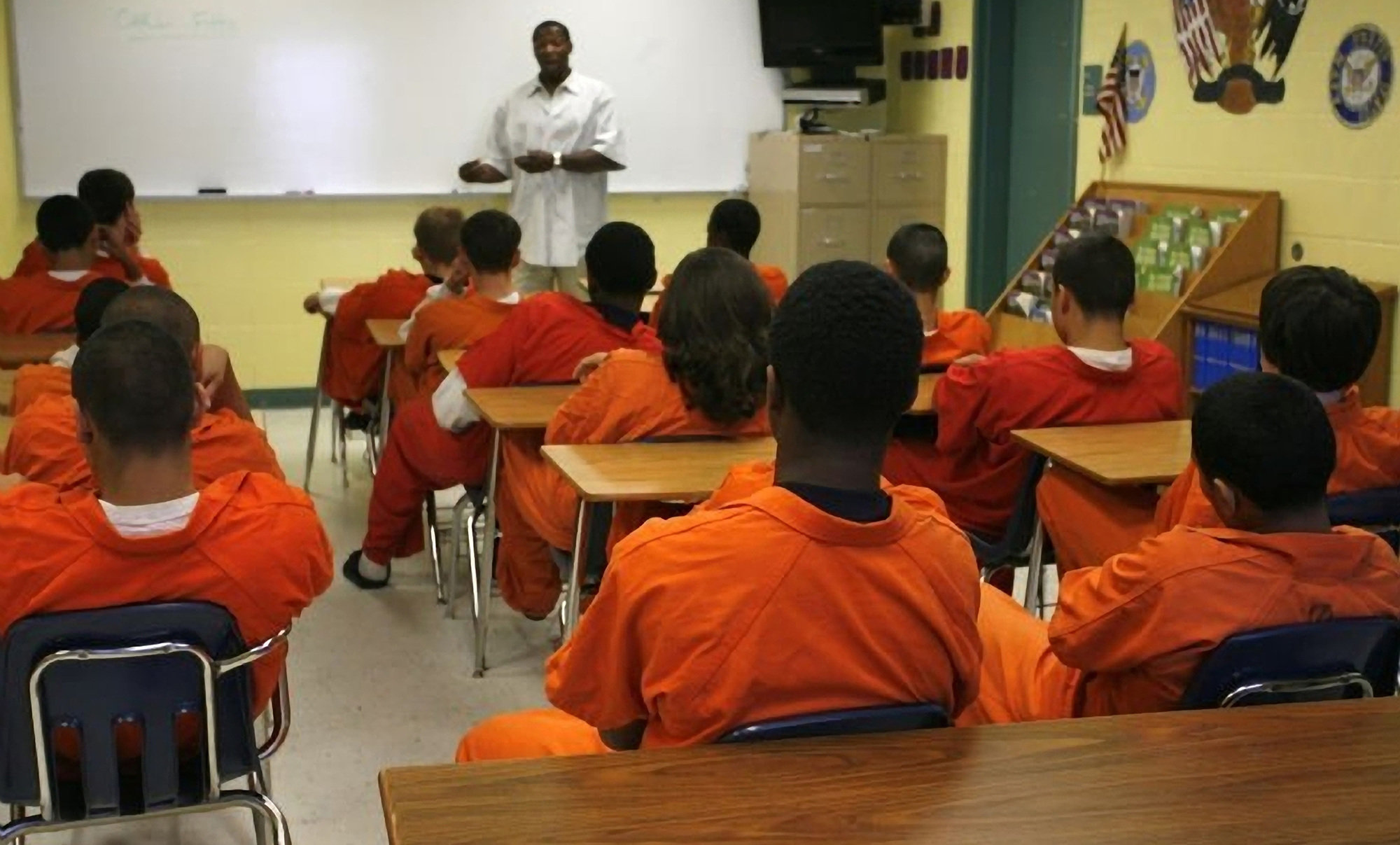
Inmates at Hillsborough County Juvenile Detention Centre in 2020

Prison-to-college programs exist around the world, providing opportunities for higher education to current and formerly incarcerated individuals in efforts to increase employment opportunities and reduce post-release recidivism rates. In the United States, programs have expanded in prisons, jails, and juvenile detention centers across the country amid calls for criminal justice reform and improving outcomes for justice-involved individuals. Integral to studies of prison-to-college programs are historical context, geographical location, program model comparisons. Equally important are implications of inequitable political, legislative, and social structures that potentially impact the long-term effectiveness of prison education programs.

== History ==
In the United States, education in prison was initially introduced by Superintendent Zebulon Brockway in the late 1800s as a way to rehabilitate prisoners at the Elmira Reformatory he ran in New York. Brockway was the first to implement a points-based behavior system that identified low risk offenders at the Monroe County Penitentiary as eligible participants for industrial/trade schools, moral education, and academia programs. While prison education programs had existed in some capacity for decades, there was a surge of interest and expansion of programs as recently as 2014. This heightened attention corresponds with the declining prison population after hitting peak incarceration rates between 2006 and 2008, as well as growing bipartisan support for criminal justice reform. Providing access to education aligned with employers' needs has been viewed as one strategy for facilitating the rehabilitation and reentry of justice-involved individuals.

Several factors have contributed to the growth of prison-to-college pipelines. There has been increasing evidence that the denial of Pell Grants for incarcerated students as part of the 1994 Crime Bill negatively impacted incarceration, recidivism, and employment trends. Coupled with research showing positive outcomes from correctional education programs, policymakers reconsidered restrictions on Pell grant access. In 2015, the U.S. Department of Education launched the Second Chance Pell pilot program, allowing certain colleges and universities to award Pell grants to qualified incarcerated students. This pilot program was made permanent in 2022 under the Consolidated Appropriations Act. Additionally, technological innovations have enabled greater access to distance learning courses for those behind bars. As of 2022, correctional postsecondary education has expanded to include college-in-prison, prison-to-college pipeline programs, and reentry services on college campuses for returning citizens.

== Background ==
According to research, higher education can significantly contribute to successful reintegration and lower recidivism rates among this population. However, other obstacles make going to college challenging for people involved in the criminal system. Approximately 50% of those incarcerated still need a GED or a high school diploma. While some prisoners obtain these qualifications while in prison, only some can enroll in college courses. Transitioning to college after release is a significant issue due to systemic impediments, including stigma, financial assistance constraints, and admissions restrictions. Several states, universities, and nonprofit organizations have created focused programs and projects to establish prison-to-college pipelines in recognition of these obstacles. These aim to give prisoners a way to start or finish their postsecondary education when released.

== Program models ==
The availability of government funding facilitated the emergence of legislation, policies, and organizations providing adult second education and literacy programs for incarcerated, formerly incarcerated, and systems-impacted individuals. Diverse program models and partnerships have emerged between institutes of higher education (IHEs) and correctional systems to provide postsecondary educational opportunities. These program models were built on the guiding principles of the Workforce Innovation and Opportunity Act (WIOA) which focused on economic development through literacy and education. Prison-college pipeline programs are education strategies that support admitted students to continue pursuing their degrees post-release at partner colleges, which may offer scholarships, reentry planning, and supportive services. Program models vary across the nation providing different levels of education ranging from basic adult or remedial education to vocation programs that prepare inmates for employment. Degree-bearing prison-to-college programs are less common because inmates do not receive credit in some instances. Some common approaches include College-in-prison programs where IHE faculty teach courses on-site at correctional facilities that build towards certifications or degrees. Imprisoned college tutors may also facilitate courses. Hybrid programs that offer a mix of in-person and distance learning courses using technology like secure tablet devices which increases flexibility and course options.

Some prison-college pipeline programs support admitted students in pursuing their degrees post-release at partner colleges, which may offer scholarships, reentry planning, and supportive services. Expanded reentry services for returning college-bound citizens can also provide mentoring, counseling, and career support in order to meet other needs. Programs vary substantially in cost, credit offerings, accreditation status, vocational vs. liberal arts focus, and support services provided. This contributes to outcome variability. Several states have developed centralized hubs, like the California Community Colleges Chancellor's Office of Correctional Education. This office aims to coordinate programs, funding, and policy across campuses. The alliance of community college programs offers credit-bearing classes in 35 prisons throughout California. In 2017, there were more than 5,000 enrolled students.

Another program, the College after Prison Workshop, was created due to the educational experiences of women who had completed their sentences. This workshop sought to lower barriers to pursuing higher education after discharge and raise college self-efficacy. In contrast Lampe-Martin and Beasley found that state-level coordination gaps still inhibit the pipeline for many students.

=== Cal State LA's Prison B.A. Graduation Initiative ===
In 2020 a UC-Fresno case study focused on the transformative effects of Cal State LA's Prison B.A. Graduation Initiative. The study involved 45 students, who, through interviews, demonstrated that college education in prison enhances hope, humanity, and transformation, even for those serving life sentences.

=== Right to vote ===
The politics of restoring voting rights after incarceration presents challenges in the re-enfranchisement process. While twelve states permanently deny voting rights, there are processes for restoration.

== Effectiveness ==
An evaluation by the RAND Corporation found Second Chance Pell recipients had 48% higher odds of securing employment post-release, higher wages, and lower rates of recidivism relative to non-participants. Public surveys have also shown strong bipartisan support for expanding these initiatives to give second chances, especially for juveniles. More data is needed for long-term outcomes like program completion, post-release enrollment, credential attainment, and persistence in degree programs. One study found that while 91% of surveyed programs offer transitional support, only 4% track student outcomes for more than one academic year post-release, indicating pipeline gaps. There are also equity concerns around disproportionate program availability along racial lines and access for justice-involved students with disabilities.

Generally increased access to high-quality, accredited prison-to-college program shows promise for improving outcomes. This should be coupled with the idea that broader policy changes are integral to dismantling the societal inequalities that contribute to mass incarceration in the first place.
