= Prison library =

Library in a correctional facility

The term prison library refers to libraries that provide educational, legal, recreational and other resources in correctional facilities throughout the globe. While their services are primarily oriented toward inmates, they may also serve other members of the prison community, such as the inmates' families and prison staff. Key differences that set a prison library apart from other types of libraries, such as public or academic, include the level of access to qualified library staff, skills required as a prison library worker, the level of censorship, reduced privacy, limited or no internet access and the goals of collections and library programming. The quality and nature of a prison library can vary based on the country, state, city, and individual institution. Prison libraries are often managed by a trained librarian, educator, clergy or prison personnel, but in some cases a single librarian may oversee the libraries of multiple institutions at once. Inmates may also work in prison libraries.

In the United States, reading materials are provided in almost all federal and state correctional facilities. Libraries in federal prisons are controlled by the Federal Bureau of Prisons, U.S. Department of Justice. State prison libraries are controlled by each state's own department of corrections. Many local jails also provide library services through partnerships with local public libraries and community organizations. These resources may be limited, mostly provided through government sources.

== Role ==
Prison libraries have an important role in serving currently incarcerated people by providing access to educational opportunities, promoting mental health and wellbeing, and fostering opportunities to cultivate family connection. Because of these opportunities, prison libraries in the research are reported to decrease likelihood of recidivism among reentry citizens.

Research shows a correlation between education and reduced recidivism, and libraries play an important role in supporting education. Many currently active prison libraries offer education through reading materials and literacy programs such as Hydebank Library where currently incarcerated people can practice reading aloud in the library, interact with one another through programming, and work on creative projects. In other correctional institutions, prisoners are sentenced to a literature discussion group in lieu of prison time. One such program called Changing Lives Through Literature (CLTL) has been operating since 1991. The first CLTL group in Massachusetts had a 19 percent recidivism rate as compared to 42 percent in a control group. Education allows inmates to obtain the skills they need to transition back into society once they are released, and libraries can play in an important role in helping inmates learn these skills. Some programs prison libraries offer include, GED instruction, literacy classes, life skills classes, typing instruction, and classes on how to use a library.

In addition to educational opportunities, through various literacy skills programming and activities, prison libraries can play a role in building family relationships. For example, the Jessup Correctional Institute in Maryland started a program that provided books for prisoners to read to their children or grandchildren on visiting days. Other prison libraries have programs in which prisoners record reading stories, and the tapes and books, along with a coloring book and crayons, are sent to their child. Some inmates try to read the same materials their children are reading, so they have something to talk about with them.

Prison libraries provide a space for inmates to meet with others with common interests. Prison libraries' physical spaces can also provide comfort and support the mental wellbeing of currently incarcerated people. Though funding is limited, some prison librarians are diligent in providing programming. Such programs include book clubs and community service projects. Many inmates utilize the library as a means of escape from the reality of their current situations. One of the many services provided by a prison librarian is to have conversation with the inmates regarding the reasons they are in their current situation, after which, the librarian will make catalog suggestions to the inmate that will give them guidance in future decision making.

== Challenges ==
Funding and space are two major challenges for prison libraries. Prison libraries are on the low end of budget priorities for prisons. It is difficult to provide up-to-date information and classes with a limited budget and space. Associated with limited budgets are time constraints. Some prison library staff feel they do not have the time to complete all of the tasks they need to because prison libraries are understaffed. By 2019, technological developments such as the choice to transition to tablet-based information access led to prison elimination of law libraries in South Dakota and has threatened to end book donations to prisoners and their libraries in favor of charging prisoners for books available in e-book format. Another challenge is the literacy of inmates. For example, in the United States, "seventy-five percent of the state prison population did not complete high school or are classified as low literate". Other challenges include security risks. Some librarians feel like they are guards and other libraries are monitored by correctional officers. Finally, some libraries have to deal with damage and theft of items. Library staff may also be responsible for scanning books for contraband such as tobacco and betting cards, which can be considered a form of censorship.

A challenge in the development of prison libraries in the US came about in the Steven Hayes case, where library collection policies, and patron (prisoner) privacy came into question. It was suspected that Hayes' reading choices in his former prison "fueled his crimes". The prosecutors in his case wanted to see Hayes' reading lists after he was convicted of the murder, kidnapping and sexual assault of members of the Petit family. This issue is contentious because according to normal library policies, patron privacy is a very serious matter, and the question of whether it changes within a prison library was highly debated. Conrad does not mention that any real rulings and/or concrete decisions have been reached as there are strong arguments both for maintaining prisoners' privacy, as with any other patron, and there are arguments for that information to be made available to ensure that there is no danger to the prisoner, prison population or general public.

Censorship is another major challenge reported by prison libraries. The Federal Bureau of Prisons regulations state that publications can only be rejected if they are found to be "detrimental to the security, good order, or discipline of the institution or if it might facilitate criminal activity." However, prisons censor materials far beyond these guidelines. Restrictions on the content of materials in prison libraries are imposed by prison authorities such as wardens, administrators, and security personnel, resulting in the infringement on prisoners' right to read. "Both formal and informal processes of censorship occur in the prison, and there is significant variation in which materials are censored from one institution to the next." Typical topics that are censored include works mentioning violence, pornography, hate against a particular group crime, or instructions on how to commit crimes. Arguments against this kind of censorship include the observation that violence is present in most media, including the news. Conrad points out that while there are valid security concerns, like other libraries, prison libraries can protect intellectual freedom by building and maintaining appropriate collections development policies.

In another example of the conflict between safety and free access to information, many prisons only offer limited internet access to inmates or none at all. In lieu of direct internet access, inmates may be able to access resources such as educational videos, documents, and materials needed for remote classes using offline tools and databases or an internal network/prison intranet. In some cases, library professionals may have access to the internet even if their patrons do not in order to keep loan records, search for catalog items, or send emails among other functions.

== International institutions ==
At the international level, there are documents providing standards, and recommendations for how prison libraries should be run. These include Article 19 of the Universal Declaration of Human Rights (1948), the IFLA & UNESCO Joint Public Library Manifesto (1994), IFLA Guidelines for Library Service to Prisoners (first published in 1992 and last revised in 2005), and the United Nations Standard Minimum Rules for the Treatment of Prisoners (first established in 1955 and last updated in 2015), which also became known as the Nelson Mandela Rules in 2015. However, the extent to which these are actually applied varies by country, state, region, city, and individual institutions.

=== United States ===
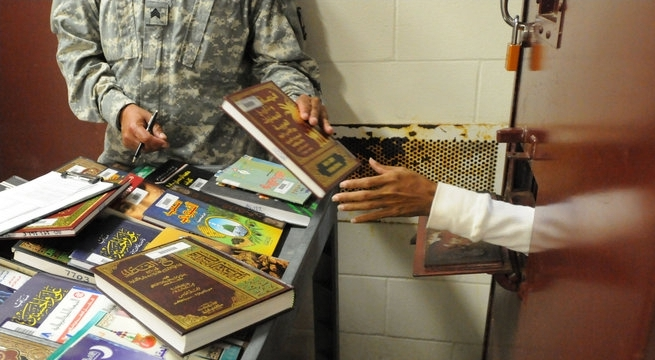
Library books, Guantanamo prison, 2011

America has had prison libraries since 1790. The first state prison library was established in 1802. At the beginning of the 19th century prisons were usually operated by the clergy. The purpose of the library was to increase religious devotion and modify behaviour. In many prisons during this time period the library collection consisted only of the Bible and sometimes prayer books. According to Lehmann (2011), "The main purpose of reading was believed to be strengthening of character, religious devotion, and what we today would call behavior modification. By the mid-nineteenth century, penology (the study, theory, and practice of prison management and criminal rehabilitation) had become more scientific, and criminologists claimed that they knew the reasons for criminal behavior and, consequently, how to reform criminals."

In 1870, during the Progressive Period and Prison Reform Movement, the Prison Congress began calling for rehabilitation of convicts instead of retribution, and education and rewards for good behaviour. The library was seen as an incentive and only contained items which furthered the reformative goals of the prison. The first manual for prison libraries was published by the American Library Association in 1915.

During the Great Depression prison libraries were expanded. With a decline in industrial demands prisoners became idle and restless and libraries were seen as a way to occupy them. In 1930, a manual for prison libraries was published by the American Correctional Association. The library was believed to be wholesome recreation, which also supported education and mental health, and there was great growth in federal prison libraries for the next four decades.

State correctional facilities began to see growth in prison libraries in the 1970s when the Library Services and Construction Act was authorized by Congress. In 1974, two Massachusetts cases – Wolf v. McDonnell and Stone v. Boone – mandated that prisons provide on-site libraries, which paved the way for Bounds v. Smith, 430 U.S. 817 (1977). Bounds v. Smith ruled that prisons were required to provide access to people trained in law or law library collections in order to meet the constitutional requirement of meaningful access to the courts. In 1996, Lewis v. Casey, 518 U.S. 343 (1996), limited the requirement placed on correctional facilities. Following Lewis many libraries reduced their collections.

Lewis v. Casey ruled that prisoners do not have an absolute right to a law library. Rather an inmate must show that he was unable to pursue a legal claim because of the inadequacy of the law library. In other words, lack of an adequate law library caused the inmate actual injury. The ruling in Lewis makes it much more difficult to seek improvement to a prison's law library. As one court pointed out, the ability to litigate a claim of denial of access demonstrates that the inmate has no denial of access. However, some believe that Lewis is not as devastating as it appears to be and Bounds v. Smith still remains good law. Post-9/11, prison library budgets were slashed.

As of 2013 the Guantanamo Bay detention camp in Cuba has a library of some 18,000 books. According to the Bureau of Justice Statistics, there were 1,505,400 Federal and State prisoners in the United States. The United States incarcerates more people than any other nation in the world.

Librarians seeking to bring attention to books and voices that have been in the margins—living in poverty, on the streets, in custody—and that addresses the disproportionality of injustices experienced by BIPOC youth, honor these books with the annual "In the Margins Award."

=== Canada ===
The first prison library in Canada was formed in the 19th century. In the 1980s, the Correctional Service of Canada commissioned two reports on institutional libraries throughout Canada, the analysis of which defined the role of prison libraries and made recommendations to support these roles. However, many of the challenges identified in these reports still exist, but many improvements were made until drastic budget and staffing cutbacks were made in 1994. While prison libraries are required to support all correctional programs, including education and access to legal and non-legal materials, they have not been spared budget cuts and are struggling to maintain existing programs. Often funds are spent on materials rather than staff.

However, progress has been made on publishing standards, and most institutional libraries have a procedures manual. In addition, they have been able to establish a Regional Multi-Lingual Collection and a Regional Aboriginal Collection, in response to the diversity of people within the prison system. Finally, some progress has been made in getting library staff back and all new hires are required to be certified library technicians.

=== Chile ===
While books had previously been available to some prisoners in connection to educational programs, the first official prison libraries were established in Santiago around 1978. There was a second wave of support for both prisons and prison libraries in 2005. The subsequent deterioration of these libraries, especially in rural areas, led the Chilean public library system to launch a study from 2015-2019 to investigate how to improve the effectiveness of prison libraries while making improvements to existing libraries and establishing new ones with the goal of providing an official library to all correctional facilities with over 50 inmates by the end of 2019. This would provide access to libraries for 99% of prisoners. Key areas of focus for this improvement project included digital literacy instruction, improving existing libraries, building new libraries, encouraging new and lasting reading habits, and supporting additional and ongoing training for library professionals. The digital literacy aspect of this project built upon the earlier, successful Biblioredes initiative launched in 2002. Improving collections involved providing both a basic core collection across all libraries, and more specialized materials tailored to the needs of each prison community.

In Chile, prison libraries are managed by the Gendarmerie of Chile, which oversees the security of Chilean prisons and appoints prison library directors among other functions. In their 2014 report providing a snapshot of the state of prison libraries from 2010-2012, authors Piñones and Nuñez placed Chile's prison libraries into 3 ranked categories based on what body they report to in addition to the Gendarmerie, what kind of professional manages them, and the extent of the services they provide. At the highest level are the prison libraries linked to public libraries, which made up 12.1% of prison libraries at the time of the study. These are often found in larger urban areas, are managed by a trained librarian, report to the Directorate of Archives, Libraries and Museums (Dirección de Bibliotecas y Museos, DIBAM), and are the most likely to have audiovisual materials in addition to print collections. In the second category are Learning Resource Centers (Centros de Recursos de Aprendizaje, CRAs), which made up 30.8% of prison libraries, are led by an educator, and are overseen by the Ministry of Education. The third group, which the authors call "collections" refers to facilities that have an informal, non-library collection of books. These collections (19.8% of prison libraries) are overseen by prison administrators and a prisoner they select. The Gendarmerie provides funding for library workshops, but not collections or other library needs. Instead, each prison funds its own library or libraries. Books are often donated by non-profit and government organizations. As of 2018, Rivera Donoso reported that Chile had made funds available for cultural projects, which can include supporting prison libraries.

Common challenges for Chilean libraries include lack of adequate collections and infrastructure across all institutions. But, as a strength, 68.4% of Chilean prison libraries were managed by a trained professional as of 2014, whether this is a librarian or educator. Since then, Chile's public library system has aimed to increase these numbers.

=== China, People's Republic of ===
In prisons dedicated towards common (non-political) prisoners, the right to access reading material is guaranteed, conditional upon good behaviour, including satisfactory performance in duties assigned. During the Cultural Revolution, however, camps operated by the reform through labour program were not guaranteed reading materials beyond the works of Mao Zedong.

=== England and Wales ===
Prisons are required by statute to have a library and permit all prisoners to access the library. Unlike most countries, prison libraries in England and Wales are required to staff a professional librarian and there are minimum staffing requirements. The vision of the prison libraries is to provide services similar to those of public libraries. CILIP's Prison Library Group actively supports prison libraries in England and Wales through promotion, policy, advice, continuing education, networking, advocacy, mentoring, publishing, and involvement. Between 2005 and 2008 prison libraries' funding almost doubled. Prison libraries must meet required standards and are subject to inspection.

=== France ===
France has had prison libraries since the mid-19th century. They were established primarily through prison funds or donations made by prisoners. Today, prison libraries are mandated by France's Criminal Procedure Code. However, according to Cramard, these libraries vary in size, location, inmate access time, etc. In addition, while all prisons are required to have a library there is no requirement for them to have a librarian and many have partnered with local public libraries to meet their needs.

"In order to introduce a larger audience to the institution libraries, the SPIP quickly took the initiative to develop a series of projects around books, literature, and writing." Projects include regularly scheduled workshops, such as writing skills classes, reading groups, reading workshops, and storytelling workshops, and one-time events, such as meetings with writers and illustrators and writing workshops. However, prison libraries are still a work-in-progress and the Prison Administration has declared that in 2008–2010 transforming prison libraries would be a priority.

=== Germany ===
Prison libraries have existed in Germany since the 19th century and were run by the clergy. The libraries contained religious materials from various denominations, which inmates were encouraged to read and discuss. In the 20th century prison libraries were run by teachers. It was not until professional librarians began operating inside prison libraries that they began to really develop; however, not all German prison libraries employ a professional librarian. The purpose of the prison library is to provide recreation, support education, and help with the personal development of inmates. Every inmate has the right to access a library and most prisons have a library. However, the law makes no specifics about the organization or contents of the library. And, economic troubles and the closing of the German Library Institute and Commission for Special User Groups have made it difficult for libraries to provide adequate services and the social responsibility of libraries is rarely discussed. But, Münster Correctional Facility Library's winning of the German Library Award has drawn attention to prison libraries and inspired many to be advocates for library services to those with special needs.

=== Italy ===
Prison libraries in Italy have been around since the beginning of the 20th century and were funded by donations. It was not until the 1970s, when Italy enacted a law to reform its prisons, that every prison became required to have a library. Little in the law has changed since then, and libraries are operated by educators rather than professional librarians. There is quite a disparity between prison libraries in Italy, with some being very adequate and beautiful while others are barely operational, and still some prisons have no library at all.

The prison administration is responsible for the operation of prison libraries, services are provided by the government or volunteer groups, and professional aspects are monitored by the university and the Italian Library Association. A new interest by the central prison administration will hopefully lead to positive changes in the prison library system. However, according to Costanzo & Montecchi, Italy's prison libraries are still in need of a central organization for direction, monitoring, and standards.

=== Japan ===
Japanese prisons do not have librarians or a designated library space. Some reading materials are provided, but they are spread throughout the prison. There is essentially no control over these materials, there are no partnerships with public libraries, and Japanese inmates prefer to obtain their reading materials through purchase or from friends and family.

Japanese law mandates that inmates have access to reading materials and there is much regulation as to what reading materials inmates may possess and inspection procedures. However, the only mention of a "prison library" is a provision requiring that the warden make reading materials available. There are also policies and procedures regulating these materials. Education staff, not librarians, manage these collections.

=== Poland ===
In 1989, Poland reformed its prison system from punitive to rehabilitative, which allowed for the development of prison libraries. The goals of the prison libraries are related to the rehabilitation of inmates and, as such, collections are focused on materials that provide support for rehabilitative activities. The extent of a library collection reflects how strongly the prison administration believes in reading's influence on rehabilitation, but actual titles are chosen by library staff. The libraries are usually operated by education staff, not librarians. While there are problems with Poland's prison libraries, such as limited space, cataloguing issues, and limited hours of access, there are dedicated employees within the system that value the role education and books play in rehabilitation and are helping to provide inmates with options for leisure activities and social development.

=== Spain ===
In the late 19th century the first schools, and libraries to support those schools, were opened in prisons in Spain. The current structure of prison libraries in Spain was developed in the 1970s, and Spanish law requires that all correctional institutions have a library. In 1999, libraries were removed from the education department and placed under the cultural department. There is national support for prison libraries and many have seen growth in their collections, training for staff, and the collection of statistics. However, there is still much room for improvement. Prison libraries are still in need of professional library staff, full separation from the education department so more library focused services, such as reference, are provided, and more cooperation and networking between libraries.

== Role of libraries in lives of ex-prisoners ==
Libraries are important not only during the term of a prisoner's incarceration but also when the prisoner is released back into society. This is especially true of prisoners who have spent a long time incarcerated, as public libraries offer beneficial services. The New York Public Library has a webpage dedicated to their Jail and Prison services. In addition to the services they offer to incarcerated people, they offer a free annual resource guide called Connections, that prepares formerly incarcerated people to apply for a job after prison. The Hartford Public Library also offers ex-offender resources that include reentry and support services. Their website offers different links and resource information from employment help to family counseling. The Denver Public Library even offers to "sign off" on the time that ex-offenders spend in classes offered in job searching.

== American Library Association ==
The American Library Association (ALA) works to provide library services to incarcerated adults and their families in the United States. ALA policy 8.2 (formerly 52.1) states, "The American Library Association encourages public libraries and systems to extend their services to residents of jails and other detention facilities within their taxing areas." In addition, The Intellectual Freedom Committee has interpreted the Library Bill of Rights to include Prisoners' Right to Read. The Special Interest Group, Library Services to the Justice Involved, provides support to those who serve patrons of any age who are held in jail, prison, detention or immigration facility.

In 1992 Library Standards for Adult Correctional Institutions was published. In 1999 the ALA additionally published a standard for detained youth. In 2024 Standards for Library Services for the Incarcerated or Detained, a revision to the 1992 version, was published. In the revision the ALA states, "The new Standards will heed the current phenomenon of mass incarceration, the inequitable incarceration rates of BIPOC individuals, and the rising rates of incarceration of women (especially women of color) and pay special attention to the incarceration of LGBTQIA+ individuals, undocumented individuals, and youth in jails, prisons, and other detention facilities, as well as to the information needs of returning individuals". The rewrite of the standards is part of the Expanding Information Access for Incarcerated Peoples initiative. This initiative is in coordination between the ALA and the San Francisco Public Library's Jail and Reentry Services Program. The initiative and the new standards were made possible by a grant from the Andrew W. Mellon Foundation.

The new standards extend support of intellectual freedom of incarcerated people to include access to digital access and literacy. The ALA stated that incarcerated people have a right to digital literacy skills training and that they should have access to digital services and materials at no cost, including digital legal databases and other legal resources.

== Bibliography ==
- American Library Association. Standards for Library Services for the Incarcerated or Detained. Chicago, 2024.
- Austin, Jeanie. (2022). Library Services and Incarceration: Recognizing Barriers Strengthening Access. Chicago: ALA Neal-Schuman.
- Bowe, C. (2011). Recent trends in UK prison libraries. Library Trends, 59(3), p. 427–445.
- Clark, Sheila, and Erica MacCreaigh. (2006). Library services to the incarcerated: applying the public library model in correctional facility libraries. Westport, Conn: Libraries Unlimited.
- Conrad Suzanna. 2017. Prison Librarianship Policy and Practice. Jefferson North Carolina: McFarland & Company Inc.
- Costanzo, E. & Montecchi, G. (2011). Prison libraries in Italy. Library Trends, 59(3), p. 509–519.
- Cramard, O. (2011). The long development of prison libraries in France. Library Trends, 59(3), p. 544–562.
- Curry, A., Wolf, K., Boutilier, S., & Chan, H. (2003). Canadian federal prison libraries: A national survey. Journal of Librarianship and Information Science, 35(3), p. 141–152.
- Darby, L. T. (2004). Libraries in the American penal system. Rural Libraries, 24(2), p. 7–20.
- Garner J. "Fifty Years of Prison Library Scholarly Publishing: A Literature Analysis." Library Quarterly. 2022;92(3):241-258.
- Gerken, J. L. (2003). Does Lewis v. Casey spell the end to court-ordered improvement of prison law libraries? Law Library Journal, 95(4), p. 491–513.
- Greenway, S. A. (2007). Library services behind bars. Bookmobile Outreach Services, 10(2), p. 43–61.
- Ings, C. & Joslin, J. (2011). Correctional Service of Canada Prison Libraries from 1980 to 2010. Library Trends, 59(3), p. 386–408.
- Higgins Nick. 2017. Get Inside : Responsible Jail and Prison Library Service. Chicago Illinois: Public Library Association a division of the American Library Association.
- In the Margins Award- Annual Award for books that address the disproportionality of injustices experienced by BIPOC youth.
- Lehmann, V. (2011). Challenges and accomplishments in U.S. prison libraries. Library Trends, 59(3), p. 490–508.
- McCook, de la Peña K. (2004). Public Libraries and People in Jail. Reference and User Services Quarterly, 44(1), 26–30
- Marshall, A. M. J. (2011). Library services in correctional settings. Information Outlook, 15(1), p. 24–26.
- Nakane, K. (2011). "Prison libraries" in Japan: The current situation of access to books and reading in correctional institutions. Library Trends, 59(3), p. 446–459.
- NPR. (2011). Prison library offers place to escape.
- Peschers, G. (2011). Books open worlds for people behind bars: Library services in prison as exemplified by the Münster Prison Library, Germany's "Library of the Year 2007." Library Trends, 59(3), p. 520–543.
- Pulido, M. P. (2011). Library services in Spanish prisons: Current state of affairs. Library Trends, 59(3), p. 460–472.
- Rubin, R. J. (1973). U.S. prison library services and their theoretical bases. Occasional Papers, No. 110.
- Rubin Rhea Joyce and Daniel Suvak. 1995. Libraries Inside: A Practical Guide for Prison Librarians. Jefferson N.C: McFarland.
- Sussman, D. B. (2014). Reading Reduces Recidivism: Getting Books to Prison Libraries. ILA Reporter, 32(6), 4-7.
- Vogel Brenda. 1995. Down for the Count: A Prison Library Handbook. Metuchen N.J: Scarecrow Press.
- Zybert, E. B. (2011). Prison libraries in Poland: Partners in rehabilitation, culture, and education. Library Trends, 59(3), p. 409–426.

== See also ==
- Miriam E. Carey
- Books to Prisoners
- Prison Education
- Prison literacy
