= Prison education =

Educational activities inside prisons

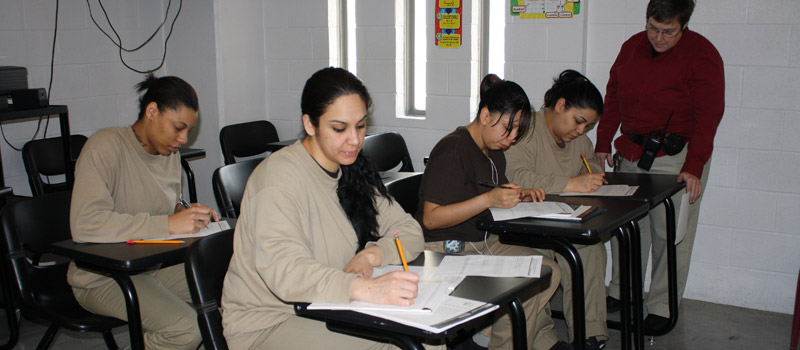
An education class for federal prisoners in the US

Prison education is any educational activity that occurs inside prison. Courses can include basic literacy programmes, secondary school equivalency programmes, vocational education, and tertiary education. Other activities such as rehabilitation programs, physical education, and arts and crafts programmes may also be considered a form of prison education. Programmes are typically provided, managed, and funded by the prison system, though inmates may be required to pay for distance education programmes. The history of and current practices in prison education vary greatly among countries.

Those entering prison systems worldwide have, on average, lower levels of education than the general population. Prison education often aims to make the inmate more employable after release. Administrating and attending educational programmes in prisons can be difficult. Staff and budget shortages, a lack of educational resources and computers, and the transfer of prisoners between facilities are common barriers. Prisoners may be reluctant to participate, often due to past educational failures or a lack of motivation.

Studies consistently show that education in prison is an effective way of reducing the rates of recidivism, which saves the expense of future prison sentences. In the United Kingdom, it is estimated that every pound spent on prison education saves taxpayers more than two pounds, and in the United States, the rate is four to five dollars saved for every dollar spent. Despite the benefits of prison education programmes, rates of education within prisons remain low in many countries, and attempts to increase funding for prison education have been opposed. Opponents argue that prison education is a waste of money and that prisoners are not deserving of the benefit.

== History ==
=== Europe ===
The history and availability of prison education in Europe varies greatly between countries. Nordic countries have a long history of providing education to prisoners, and Sweden in particular is considered to be a pioneer in the field. Prison education became mandatory for inmates under 35 in 1842, and vocational education can be traced back to at least 1874, when the Uppsala County prison hired a carpenter to teach inmates woodworking. In Denmark, juvenile offenders have had access to education since the 1850s, and educational programmes became mandatory for them in 1930. Adult prisons have had educational programmes since 1866, and legislation requiring all inmates under the age of 30 to participate in educational courses was implemented in 1952. Norway opened its first prison to focus on education as a form of rehabilitation in 1851. By 1875, all eight prisons in the country were providing education to inmates, and by the end of the century, legislation was in effect ensuring that any prisoner who had not completed primary and lower secondary schooling should do so while in prison. As of 2007, every prison in Norway has a school for inmates. In Finland, legislation was adopted in 1866 which ensured that all prisoners would receive primary education, though the implementation of the order faced practical difficulties. A more successful education reform was implemented in 1899, which remained unchanged until 1975. However Iceland, which as of 2011 averaged only 137 prisoners in the country, only began implementing education programmes in 1971.

Between 1939 and 1975, while under the rule of Francisco Franco, prisons in Spain were infamous for their harsh conditions and levels of repression. Attitudes later softened, with the 1978 Constitution declaring that prisons should be oriented at re-education rather than forced labor. While university access existed, a 1992 Human Rights Watch report found that most prisons only offered basic education and some vocational training, and female inmates had less access to education than males. As of 2018, the National University of Distance Education is the only institution allowed to provide university education to inmates. In 1976, laws in Italy clarified that prisoners were entitled to university education. However, prisoners were unable to complete courses as correctional facilities neither provided entry for teachers, nor leave for students to complete exams. Prisoners were only effectively allowed to study at university from 1986 when laws were relaxed, and further rights were enabled in 2000, greatly improving educational access. Many partnerships between prisons and universities were established between the early 2000s and mid 2010s.

The first significant development of prison education in England was Robert Peel's Gaols Act 1823 (4 Geo. 4. c. 64), which called for reading and writing classes in all prisons. While prison staff in the 1850s recognised the importance of basic literacy, they opposed giving prisoners any form of higher education on the grounds that education itself would not provide any "moral elevation". The Prison Act 1877 (40 & 41 Vict. c. 21) is considered to have established the prison system that remained in effect until the 1990s, which only offered education of a "narrow and selective kind". In 1928, the majority of prisons in the UK were still only offering the most basic education courses. By 1958, while the number of educational staff in prisons had increased, there had been no other significant advancements in prison education. Education programmes did not improve until 1992, when the decision was made to outsource educational instruction on a competitive basis. More than 150 organisations applied, and by 1994, there were 45 educational providers across 125 prisons, providing various forms of education including secondary and tertiary.

Attempts to rehabilitate prisoners in Russia were made in 1819, possibly for the first time in the country's history. Reforms included instructing them in "piety and good morals", though this proved impossible due to the cramped conditions, extreme poverty and lack of other services. Instead, general improvements to conditions were first made, after which "religious and moral education" were gradually introduced. In 1918, it was recommended that children in Russian prisons should receive education alongside punishment. However, few educational programmes were implemented, because of the competing agendas of various jurisdictions and agencies. In the 1920s, efforts were made within the Gulag prison camps to eradicate illiteracy. Almost all the camps had classes on "political education", and some also had classes such as natural science, history of culture and foreign languages.

=== North America ===
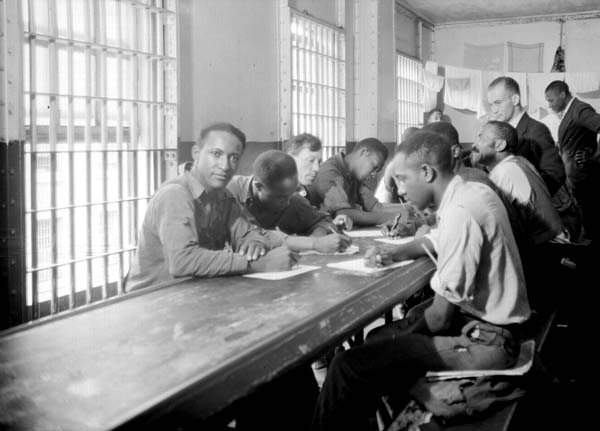
A prison literacy class for African Americans in New Orleans, 1937

In the United States, prisoners were given religious instruction by chaplains in the early 19th century, and secular prison education programmes were first developed in order to help inmates to read Bibles and other religious texts. The first major education programme aimed at rehabilitating prisoners was launched in 1876. Zebulon Brockway, the superintendent of Elmira Reformatory in New York, was the initial person to implement such a programme. He believed prison education would "discipline the mind and fit it to receive ... the thoughts and principles that constitute their possessors good citizens". By 1900, the states of Massachusetts, Ohio, Pennsylvania, Indiana, Illinois and Minnesota had adopted the "Elmira system" of education, and by the 1930s, educational programmes could be found in most prisons. Tertiary education programmes did not appear until much later. In 1960, only nine states were offering college-level education to inmates; by 1983, such programmes were available in most states.

Support and availability of educational programmes has fluctuated in the US as policy has switched between focusing on rehabilitation and crime control. Between 1972 and 1995, inmates in the US were able to apply for Pell Grants, a subsidy programme run by the US federal government that provides funding for students. However, in 1994 Congress passed the Violent Crime Control and Law Enforcement Act, which denied Pell Grants to anyone who is incarcerated. As a result, by 2005 only about a dozen prisons were offering post-secondary education, compared to 350 in the early 1990s; the number in New York dropped from 70 to 4. In 2015, President Barack Obama created a pilot programme that allowed a limited number of inmates to receive Pell grants. More than 200 colleges in 47 states subsequently expressed interest in running educational programmes for prisoners. The Pell ban was repealed in December 2020, reinstating eligibility for federal financial aid to thousands of incarcerated people in the US.

The development of prison education within Canada has paralleled that of the US. Royal Commissions in 1914 and 1936 both recommended that work programmes be replaced, at least to some extent, by rehabilitative programmes including education. However, education programmes did not become commonplace until the mid 1940s.

=== Caribbean ===
A prison system in Barbados was established in 1945. Education programmes were officially introduced into it in 1956, and focused on basic literacy and numeracy, though female prisoners were not allowed to participate until the Prison Reform Act of 1961–66 was passed. Inmates over the age of 25 were not allowed to participate in programmes until 1990, when Barbados adopted the mandate of the World Conference on Education For All. The mandate also saw the offering of vocational and secondary education in the prison system. The Dominican Republic underwent a prison reform beginning in 2003, with basic literacy becoming compulsory at nearly half the country's 35 prisons; if inmates refuse to participate they were denied privileges such as visitation. As of 2012, 36 of the 268 prisoners at Najayo women's prison were completing university degrees in either law or psychology.

Outside access to, and information regarding the conditions of prisons in Cuba following its political revolution in the 1950s is limited. The government permitted limited access for some journalists in 2013, but it is unclear to what extent those facilities may have been representative of the country's prisons as a whole. Private interviews were not permitted, but officials highlighted the system's work and study programmes, including the teaching of skilled trades such as carpentry. According to one 1988 report by the Institute for Policy Studies, prisoners were provided with education up to a ninth grade level, inmates were provided with training in technical skills and as much as 85% of the population worked. Political re-education also played a major role in Cuban penology.

=== South America ===
Education opportunities in prison are considered to be generally poorer in South America in comparison to Europe and North America. Resources for education are comparatively lacking due to rising incarceration rates and prison overcrowding, partly a by-product of the war on drugs. Prison education programmes began in Argentina in the 1950s. Although details about programmes and their effectiveness is limited, the lack of available data is attributed to corruption within the prison system, alongside poor living conditions and high levels of violence. A law was enacted in 1996 ensuring all prisoners with less than the compulsory nine years of basic schooling be able to participate in educational programmes. Due to administrative constraints, on average only about 25% of eligible prisoners participated in these programmes as of 2010.

As of 2009, Brazil was considered to have one of the most progressive policies on prison education in South America. In 1984, the National Congress of Brazil passed a prison reform law, recognising inmates' right to education and other services, though the law has not been effectively implemented. As of 1998, some prisons were not offering education at all, while others only had "a fraction" of inmates studying; about 23% of inmates at São Paulo State Penitentiary were enrolled in some form of education; access to education was "more easily available" in female prisons. A 2002 report by the Federal Court of Accounts estimated that over 90% of the federal budget for prisons was spent on construction of new jails, and the funding for programmes including education "was not used [for] consistent policies but rather punctual and dispersed initiatives proposed by the states". As of 2004, it is estimated that less than 20% of Brazil's 400,000 inmates had access to education.

=== Oceania ===
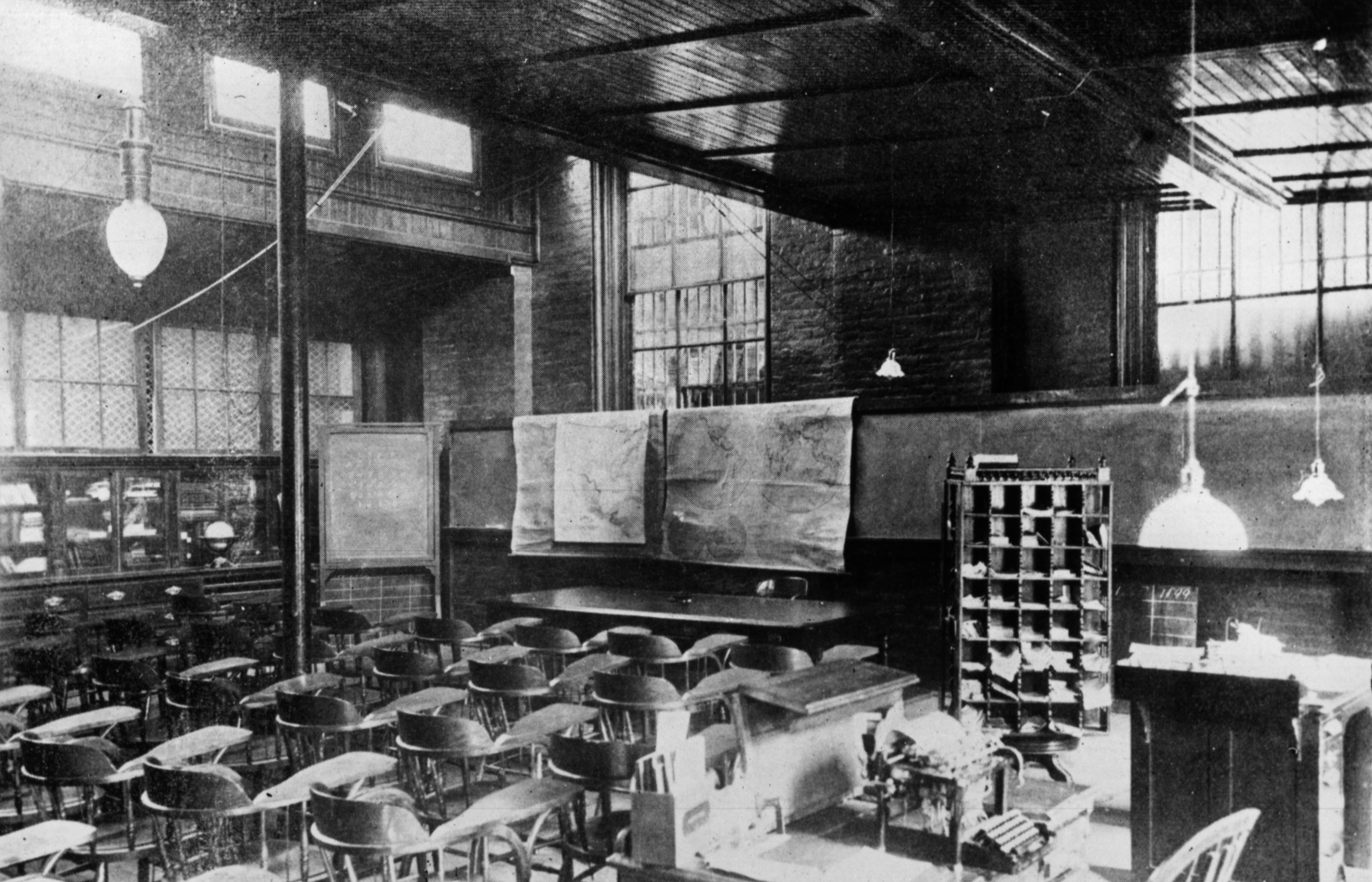
An educational classroom at a prison in New South Wales, Australia, c. 1900

The first formal education programme to be implemented in the Australian state of New South Wales was at Darlinghurst Gaol in 1862, when a schoolmaster was hired to provide elementary and moral education to any prisoner who wished to attend. Prior to this one of the prisoners had been providing educational lessons to other inmates. By the early 1900s, basic literacy programmes were commonplace throughout Australian prisons. By the 1950s, all major prisons in the country were offering some form of education and training programmes, though no more than 15 to 20% of inmates at any given prison could participate in educational programmes at one time, and little education was offered above basic literacy and vocational courses. In New South Wales in 1975, out of over 3,500 prisoners, only 17 were enrolled in high school programs, and only 18 were enrolled in university and higher education.

The Senate Employment, Education and Training References Committee produced the Senate Report of the Inquiry into Education and Training in Correctional Facilities in 1996. The report stated that the history of prison education in Australia "could fairly be described as a disgrace", with non-existent or poor facilities containing deficient and out-dated curricula and resources. It made several recommendations on how to improve prison education, including the development of a national strategy. In 2001, a national strategy was launched, and by 2006, all states and territories were offering some form of tertiary education to inmates. Each state and territory, however, maintains control over its own prison education systems; there is no national system leading to differences in the way education is offered. For example, inmates in the Australian Capital Territory have been allowed to have laptop computers in their cells for educational purposes since 2006, though as of 2020 this is not available for inmates in New South Wales. Accordingly, certain educational and rehabilitation programmes that require a computer cannot be offered there.

According to the New Zealand Annual Review of Education, the availability and quality of prison education in the country decreased significantly between 1959 and 2005, as government policy shifted from prisons focusing on rehabilitation to prisons focusing on punishment. A 2005 Ombudsman's report stated there were "low levels of rehabilitative and productive activities" for prisoners in New Zealand.

=== Asia ===
It is universally known, that the cause of committing crime is the lack of moral and intellectual education. As the principle of a modern prison is to make prisoners repent and to make good citizens out of the ignorant, scandalous and weak, moral and intellectual education is indispensable.

— Official prison brochure in China, c. 1930s.

Prison education in Japan can be traced back to at least 1871, when practical ethics lectures were introduced into a prison in Tokyo. Reading and writing classes began being implemented into the prison system on a larger scale by 1881. By the late 1880s, it was believed that ethics classes were the most important form of education for prisoners, and by the 1890s, education was considered one of the most important issues of the prison system. In 1910, prison law in Japan ordered education be given to all juvenile inmates, and to any adult inmate deemed to have a need. Regulations stipulated two to four hours per day be set aside for education. In 1952, correspondence courses were introduced into all prisons, and in 1955, a high school was established at Matsumoto juvenile prison for juvenile inmates who had not completed their compulsory education. As of 2018, it is still the country's only high school in prison, and male prisoners nationwide can be transferred there on request.

Changes were made to the prison system in China in the 1920s, following the establishment of the Republic of China. Resulting from criticism of the lack of education for inmates at the time, there was a shift in the prison system away from religious and moral teaching to intellectual education and hard labour as the primary means of rehabilitation. Authorities took considerable effort to develop an effective and diverse educational curriculum. As well as teaching literacy and arithmetic, classes also included music and composition, popular ethics, Confucianism and patriotic and political doctrine; the teaching of party doctrine increased significantly in the 1930s. In 1981, the People's Republic of China incorporated prison education into its national education programme, significantly increasing access for inmates.

In India, reports showing the need for prison education were being made as early as the 19th century, however, the country's prisons focused mostly on punitive measures. In 1983, while general and vocational programmes were in place, they were considered to be understaffed and underfunded, and the types of vocational training offered were outdated. Indira Gandhi National Open University (IGNOU) is considered to play a major role in prison education in India, becoming the country's first university to operate a study centre in prison at Tihar Jail in 1994. By 2010, IGNOU had 52 prison study centres with approximately 1,500 students; several other universities were also running educational programmes in India's prisons. Enrollments remained relatively low, however, as only fee-paying students were permitted to undertake courses. In 2010, IGNOU collaborated with the Ministry of Home Affairs to begin offering free education to inmates.

=== Africa ===
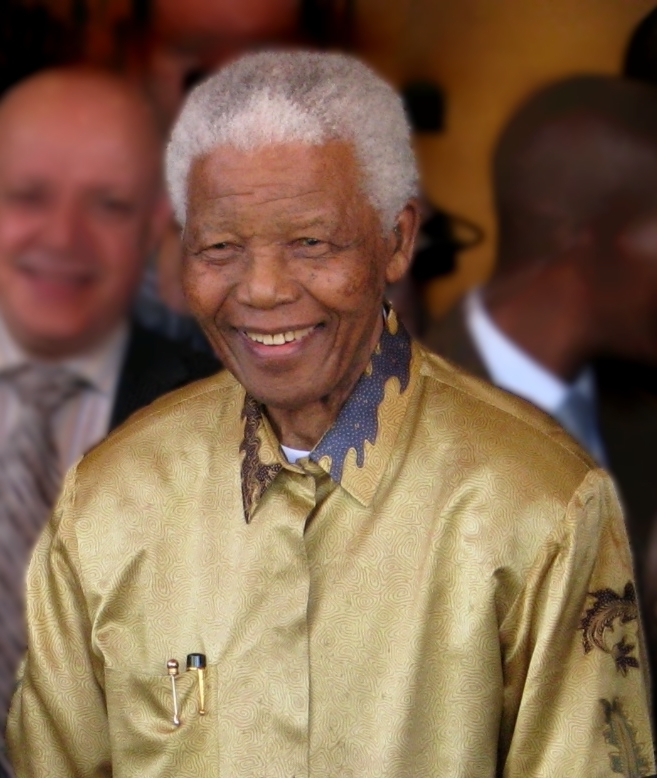
Nelson Mandela studied for his Bachelor of Laws while imprisoned on Robben Island.

Prison education is generally less well-established throughout Africa in comparison to the Western world. The first prison in Nigeria was established in 1872; however, as of 2010, no formal education programme had ever been implemented by the Nigerian government; in 1986, one prison launched organised educational programmes though they were run and funded by inmates. Following the death of de facto Nigerian President Sani Abacha in 1998, many political prisoners were released, bringing considerable media attention to the "grim conditions" they faced; prison in Nigeria was seen as purely punitive, with little to no resources given for infrastructure and rehabilitation programmes, like education. The provision of education was varied from prison to prison, though typically offered nothing better than informal apprenticeships in trades necessary to keep prisons operational. However, by 2016, the National Open University of Nigeria had established training centers at six Nigerian prisons, and offers inmates a 50% discount on all tuition fees.

In 1961, South Africa began holding criminal and political prisoners in a jail on Robben Island. Inmates were encouraged to study when the prison opened, and education programmes to ensure all inmates were literate when initiated. Only inmates whose families could afford to pay for tuition fees were permitted to participate, and access to education improved and then regressed with the prison's ever changing policy; by the end of the 1960s, programmes were restricted on the concern they were improving the inmates' morale too much. Historians also speculate the prison system was concerned that inmates were becoming better educated than the guards. Inmates were able to undertake correspondence courses through the University of London International Programmes; Nelson Mandela completed a Bachelor of Laws while in custody, though his educational privileges were revoked for four years after staff discovered he was writing an autobiography, something which was forbidden at the time. Efforts by inmates to educate themselves politically were significantly hampered by the prison's policy to forbid inmates access to newspapers, radios and television. These restrictions were lifted in the late 1970s; Jeff Radebe headed a political education programme at the prison in the 1980s. As of 1993, education was a privilege rather than one of the inmates' rights. Basic literacy courses were provided by paid inmates, rather than qualified teachers, and higher levels of education were only available to inmates who could afford correspondence courses.

With funding from the United Nations Development Programme, a basic literacy programme for inmates was launched in Ghana in 2003, and by 2008, all prisons were offering education to inmates, though the programme's effectiveness is severely affected by a lack of resources. For many years, the only prison education offered in Morocco was farming skills at the country's agricultural prisons, though a 2014 report found that educational opportunities had been increasing and that literacy, vocational and other educational programmes were being offered.

== Available programmes ==
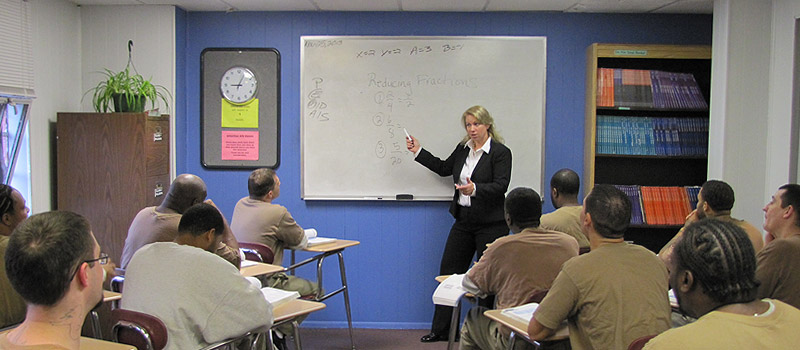
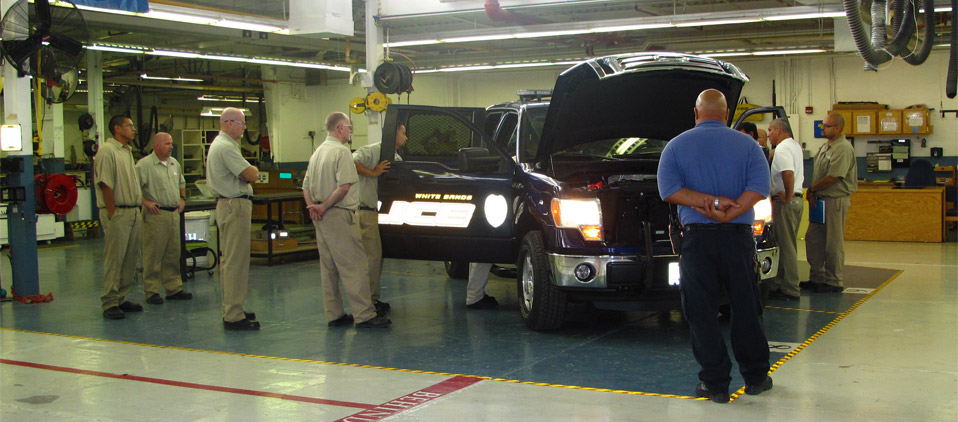
Prison education can range from basic numeracy (top) to vocational training (bottom).

Prison education courses can range from basic literacy courses and secondary school equivalency programmes to vocational education and tertiary education programmes. Non-formal activities that teach inmates new skills, like arts and crafts or amateur theatre productions, may also be considered a form of education. Likewise, some countries consider rehabilitation programmes or physical education to be educational programmes, whereas others do not. Educational programmes within prisons are typically funded by the prisons themselves, and may be run by the individual prisons or contracted out to external providers. Primary, secondary and vocational education is typically free, though some countries require inmates or their families to pay for correspondence courses. Out of 28 surveyed European countries in 2012, 15 reported offering free distance education to inmates, and 13 reported that inmates would have to pay all associated costs. In some cases, only certain courses were free; in Denmark, correspondence courses at primary and lower-secondary levels are free, though a percentage of courses undertaken at a higher level must be paid for by the inmate. Many prisons have mandated that educational programmes should focus on basic literary skills, and accordingly, some do not offer any higher levels of education. It has been argued that such an approach creates a void for developing further skills, and incorrectly suggests that people with only the most basic skills will no longer commit crimes.

Inmates in the UK are able to access the government student loans for university that are available to the general public, as are those in Australia. Charity groups, like the Prisoners' Education Trust in the UK, can accept applications for grants from prisoners who cannot afford to finance their distance education. In both Australia and the UK, prisoners on remand or in hospital are not eligible to undertake educational study, nor are prisoners on remand in Poland. Norway and Finland, however, do not house those on remand separately, and they are entitled to the same educational opportunities as regular prisoners. In Denmark and Sweden inmates on remand are entitled to some education programmes, though less than those available to other prisoners.

== Challenges ==
Many mainstream pedagogical practices carry directly over to prison education, and commonsense pedagogical considerations are often found to be the most effective, though prison restrictions can act as a detriment to their implementation. Prison education programmes have been considered to be a "delicate balancing act" between enough cooperation with the criminal justice system and genuine efforts to offer meaningful learning experiences. For example, while teachers may wish to provide ongoing support, prisons may forbid inmates from contacting them outside of their class times for ongoing feedback and help with studies. In some prisons, teachers may be required to not address inmates by their names and instead call them "offenders", which causes a barrier to developing trust between teachers and students, often considered an important factor for successful education.

Many other barriers exist to both running and participating in educational programmes in prisons. Teachers may be faced with the challenge of instructing a class that has a large variance in age, educational levels, or employment history. Similar challenges exist in juvenile prisons, due to the varying academic and emotional needs of children. Prisons consider security concerns more important than educational goals, which restricts how some vocational trades are delivered because of concerns about prisoners manufacturing weapons. Standard security measures, such as headcounts and searches, cause frequent disruptions. If prisons are on lockdown, inmates will be unable to attend classes; lockdowns can last for several weeks.

There is a common perception that inmates have a large amount of free time; however, they may only be allocated extremely limited time specifically for access to educational resources. Distance education courses are increasingly only being offered online, which presents a significant barrier as most countries do not permit inmates to access the internet. Some prisons have introduced tablet computers with offline educational content to compensate for this.

Shortages of available space in existing educational programmes can lead to significant waiting lists for enrollment. In some cases inmates may not be able to access education because the wait times are longer than their sentences. Educating foreign inmates in prisons can also be challenging, due to language barriers; inmates may be ineligible to attempt courses unless they already possess sufficient native language skills, and may also be faced with no translators available to teach them the language.

Sometimes study is just another added pressure. You're tearing your hair out because four hours a week is not enough time in the education room to keep up with all the assignments. I have to study on the floor too because there's no single cells. I'm thinking of just giving up. It's another stress you don't want to put on yourself in here.

— An Australian prisoner commenting on the difficulties of studying in custody

One of the biggest barriers to prison education is the frequent transfer of prisoners between correctional facilities. Inmates may be moved to another facility at any time for a variety of reasons, such as overcrowding, a downgrade in security classification, court appearances or medical appointments. Different prisons may have vastly different attitudes toward or available access to education. If an education course is run by the prison in-house, moving an enrollee to another prison will effectively force them to drop out. Inmates studying correspondence courses will have to notify their course provider, usually by mail, of their change in circumstance, and will be reliant on the goodwill of both the course provider and the new prison's staff to help them catch up on any missed work. If study materials are lost or misplaced in-transit, inmates will have to reapply to education providers for replacements. Being moved between facilities is a major cause of inmates ceasing study at university level.

Other hindrances to prison education are staff shortages, not being able to contact lecturers or other students easily, a lack of educational resources in prison libraries, not having a dedicated room to hold classes in, a lack of audio-visual equipment and computers (or simply a lack of access to them), not having a suitable place to study (shared cells often do not have desks) and not having a suitable place for group work activities after classroom hours. In-house educators may not have adequate training from the prison for their role, and a prison may have difficulty finding external teachers willing to work for the rates of pay that prisons can offer. Government departments charging one another for services may also present a barrier. For example, a state-owned prison's budget may not allow it to afford the fees set by a state-owned education provider. Prison education programmes may also face a lack of support or outright opposition from prison personnel where they operate. For example, some prison staff may resent the inmates' educational opportunities, because they are poorly educated themselves, or because they had to pay for their education while inmates are receiving theirs for free. Prisoners who have to pay for tuition, however, may be reluctant to enroll as they will not receive refunds if they cannot complete studies due to lockdowns or other circumstances beyond their control. They are also often reluctant to take out student loans for fear of leaving prison with debt. Prisoners may also be hesitant as education can be used as a way of further punishing or controlling them, as studying is a privilege officers can threaten to take away for trivial reasons.

Other reasons for reluctance to participate in programmes from inmates include previous failures in education and lack of motivation. Foreign inmates who will be deported at the end of their sentence often lack incentive to learn the language of the country they are incarcerated in, or obtain qualifications there. The types of vocational training offered by prisons in the Western world, such as manufacturing, will often not be useful to someone who will be deported to a country where the manufacturing industry is not well developed. Other types of vocational training, such as certain forms of woodwork, are outdated and will not realistically lead to employment opportunities. Juvenile prisoners may face difficulties transferring back to regular schooling after their release, due to problems recognising course credit for studies undertaken in prison. Financial incentives also play a factor in an inmate's decision to participate in educational programmes. In both the UK and Belgium, the allowance given to inmates who undertake study is lower than that given to inmates who undertake domestic work such as cleaning or food-preparation, which results in inmates having a preference for domestic work. Inmates with children have a particular preference for employment over education in prison, as it enables them to send more money to their families.

Despite the challenges, some prisoners report finding it easier to study in prison due to having less distractions, and prisoners are also often more motivated than the general population to study, resulting in higher retention rates. Lecturers working in prison report prisoners are more likely to have prepared for classes and read course notes than students in the general population.

The COVID-19 pandemic exacerbated many of the existing challenges to education in prison, such as increased lockdowns and transfer of prisoners between facilities. Teachers and staff were often not allowed to enter prisons due to restrictions, resulting in educational programmes being suspended. In other cases, external institutions that provided education to prisons themselves closed down during the pandemic. Posted materials being quarantined also impacted programmes that continued to run, resulting in instructors often receiving coursework from inmates well after they were due. While many education providers were able to switch to remote learning via the internet during the pandemic, this continued form of education was unable to be provided to many prisons as they do not permit internet access.

== Reductions in recidivism ==
=== Rates ===
Recidivism in many countries is high, with rates over 50% not uncommon. Recidivism rates are difficult to compare between countries, due to differences in laws and also what constitutes recidivism. Some countries consider simply being re-arrested as recidivism, whereas others count re-conviction or re-imprisonment. There is also little consistency in the periods of time measured, and some countries do not release figures at all. A 2019 study analysing the latest available figures from 23 countries and self-governing areas found that within two years of release, re-arrest rates ranged from 26% (Singapore) to 60% (US), re-conviction rates ranged from 20% (Norway) to 63% (Denmark), and re-imprisonment rates ranged from 14% (Oregon, US) to 45% (Australia).

=== Reasons ===
People in prison systems worldwide are consistently less educated than the general population, and ex-prisoners are also less likely to obtain employment after release than people of the same age that do not have a criminal record. Prison education programmes are intended to reduce recidivism by increasing an inmate's ability to secure employment. A study in the UK in 2002 found that employment reduced a former prisoner's chance of re-offending by at least a third, and a meta-analysis conducted by the RAND Corporation, which completed a comprehensive literature search of studies released in the US between 1980 and 2011, found that participating in educational courses increased an inmate's chances of being employed post-release by 13%.

Prison education programmes consistently have a significant effect on reducing recidivism, whereas prison labour, which is typically more prevalent in prison than education, has been shown to have little to no effect. Prison education also has therapeutic benefits such as alleviating boredom, improving self-esteem and stimulating creativity, all of which have been linked to reductions in recidivism; studies have shown that the majority of benefits from high-school equivalency programmes in prison come from the experience of learning, rather than from the opportunities that arise after obtaining the qualification. Educational programmes have also been shown to reduce violence within prisons; UNESCO has suggested general educational programmes for prisoners as a way of combating extremism. Education has also been advocated for prisoners who are not expected to ever be released, on the grounds that it promotes a better atmosphere in the prison community, and prisoners serving life sentences often act as role models for others.

=== Effects ===
==== Study designs ====
Observational studies of the effects of education on recidivism have been criticised for self-selection bias: it has been argued that recidivism is not due to the educational courses themselves, but only reflects the positive attitudes of people who volunteer for them. "Quasi-experimental" attempts to control for such biases with paired difference tests have found that the effect on recidivism persists. Trials that randomly assigned prisoners to either a treatment group or a control group, thus making self-selection impossible, found similar effects. Such fully-experimental interventions (randomised controlled trials) are rare in criminology; practical difficulties are often cited as a reason for this lack, but the culture of the academic field may be more relevant. A study in North Carolina using data from 1990-1991 found that there was no significant difference in outcomes for prisoners who volunteered for programmes, compared to those who were required to participate in education due to official mandates, supporting a call for mandatory literacy programmes in prison.

Some studies on the link between recidivism and education in prison disregard results if an inmate does not complete the educational course; such studies therefore never measure the potential benefits of simply participating in courses. Due to the disparaging factors that prevent inmates from completing education programmes, studies that only record results for graduates are especially vulnerable to selection bias, as they utilise an independent variable that is strongly associated with ability and motivation, though they are not able to adjust for these factors. Studies on prison education have a reputation for measuring effectiveness against rates of recidivism alone, and do not take into consideration any other factors such as the experience from the perspective of either students or teachers.

==== History and results ====
In the US, there were few studies on the relationship between educational programmes and recidivism before the 1970s. The first was done at the Ohio Penitentiary in 1924, and examined 200 inmates who had completed correspondence programmes. The results, which found that inmates in the programme were more "successful" after release, established the first link in the US between prison education and reduced recidivism. A 1948 study at a Wisconsin State Prison examined 680 prisoners who attended full-time study in custody for two years after their release. Results indicated a "small but statistically significant" decrease in recidivism. The first extensive study undertaken to examine the relationship was called Project Newgate. Beginning in 1969, and studying 145 inmates in Minnesota over five years, results indicated that inmates who participated in an education programme were more than 33% less likely to return to prison. Other results at the time were not unanimous. A meta-analysis in 1975 and another in 1983 found that while education programmes in prison were beneficial for inmates, their effects on recidivism were inconclusive; the methods used in these meta-analyses have been considered to be of poor quality by modern standards. Later studies, however, consistently show that educational programmes reduce the rates of re-offending. A 1987 study of Federal Bureau of Prisons inmates found that those who participated in education programmes were 8.6% less likely to return to prison, and a 1997 study of 3,200 inmates in Maryland, Minnesota and Ohio found a reduction rate of 29%. A meta-analysis of 15 studies done in the US during the 1990s found that, on average, inmates who attended tertiary level education in prison were 31% less likely to re-offend. The RAND Corporation meta-analysis found that, on average, there was a reduction rate of 13% for inmates who participated in educational programmes, and a meta-analysis of 57 studies in the US between 1980 and 2017 found the average recidivism reduction was 32%. A meta-analysis between 1980 and 2023 found an recidivism reduction of 24% overall, and a reduction of 12.4% when sources were limited to those since 2010, which were considered to be of the highest quality. An educational programme created by the Bard Prison Initiative has a recidivism rate of 4% for people who only attended the course and 2.5% for those who completed it.

An Australian study of prisoners released between July 2001 and November 2002 found that in the two years following release, inmates who participated in educational programmes were nine per cent less likely to return to prison. A 2005 report found that in the Australian state of Queensland there was a 24–28% reduction in the rate of recidivism among inmates who completed education courses. A study of 14,643 prisoners in Western Australia between 2005 and 2010 found that those who undertook prison education were 11.25% less likely to be re-incarcerated. In England and Wales, a 2014 study of more than 6,000 prisoners found that those who undertook education courses were seven per cent less likely to return to prison. A prison education programme in Ukraine had only three out of 168 participants (1.8%) re-offend in 2013; the re-offending rate in Ukraine in 1993 was 30% within three years and 66% within five years. As of 2012, the re-offending rate in the Dominican Republic for persons incarcerated in prisons with mandatory educational programmes is less than 3% after three years, compared to about 50% for those in prisons without such programmes.

Effects of prison education courses have been found to be cumulative; studies show the more classes an individual takes while in prison, the less likely they will be to re-offend. Studies also show higher level qualifications are associated with lower re-offending rates. A 2000 study by the Texas Department of Education found that the overall re-offending rate was 40–43%, though the rate for inmates who completed an associate degree or bachelor's degree was 27.2% and 7.8% respectively.

There is less data available on the relationship between educational programmes and recidivism in juvenile detention. Results are difficult to measure as juvenile inmates are more likely to finish their sentences before their schooling is completed. Further complications arise in countries where all juvenile inmates typically receive education, such as the US, as it is not possible to compare the effects of programmes against a "no education" control group. A meta-analysis in the US in 2014 found that juveniles who completed secondary school equivalency programmes were 47% less likely to offend. Meta-analysis on the impact of vocational education on juvenile offenders, however, only showed minor improvements below the level of statistical significance.

== Cost and financial benefits ==
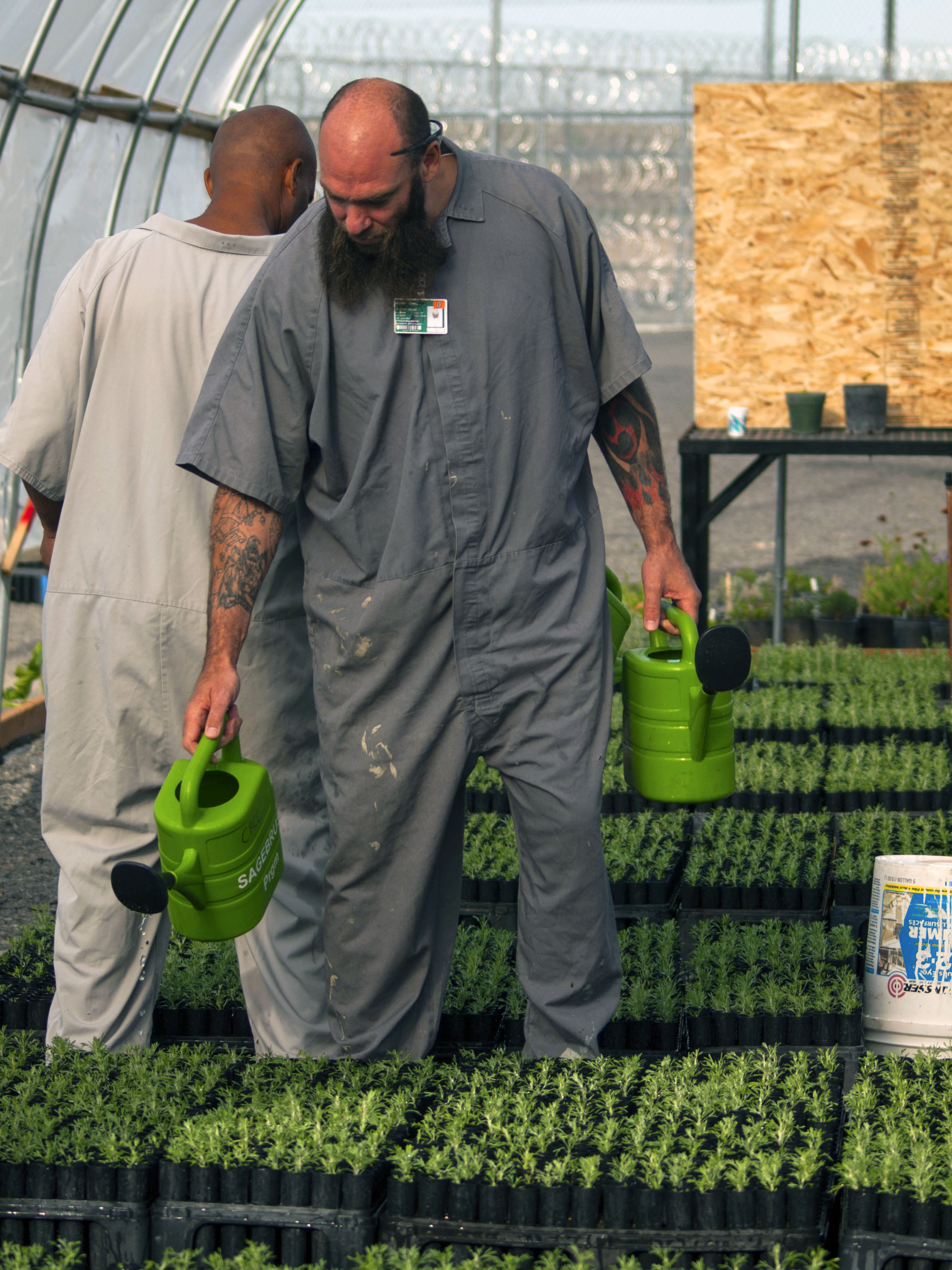
Prisoners from the Coyote Ridge Corrections Center in 2015, participating in a Bureau of Land Management programme to preserve sagebrush habitat, and the species that depend on it. Inmates needed to complete a conservation course to participate in the programme.

In 2013, the cost of providing education to a prisoner in the United States was between $1,400 and $1,744 a year, and the cost of incarceration was between $28,323 and $31,286 per inmate, while in Canada the cost was on average $2,950 per year for education, and $111,202 for incarceration per male inmate; female inmates cost approximately twice this amount to incarcerate. In England and Wales, education courses linked with reduced recidivism are priced at about £250 each as of 2014, compared to an average annual cost of £37,648 to incarcerate each inmate. In Australia in 1988, the cost of incarcerating a prisoner was $40,000 a year, while the entire budget for prison education at Bathurst Correctional Complex was $120,000 per year. In order for that prison's programme to be cost effective at that time, it would have only needed to keep one person out of prison for three years. As of 2024, the average cost of incarcerating a prisoner in Australia is $159,074 a year.

Studies have found that due to the increased post-release employment and decreased recidivism associated with prison education, the financial savings to the community more than offset the cost of the programmes. A 2003 study found that a prison education programme in Maryland reduced recidivism by 20%. Government analysts estimated that the programme was saving taxpayers more than $24 million a year based solely on the costs of re-incarceration. In the State of Washington, the cost of post-secondary prison education in 2016 was $1,249 per inmate, while the total financial savings per inmate due to the courses was found to be $26,630. In 2019, the Washington State Institute for Public Policy concluded there was a 100% chance that post-secondary education programmes would produce benefits greater than the course costs, while vocational and basic literacy education were both found to have a 98% chance of being cost-effective, with net savings of $17,226 and $11,364 per inmate respectively. A meta-analysis in the US between 1980 and 2023 found positive economic returns for all education programs, ranging from an additional 61.15% return on top of the initial investment for university education, to 205.12% for vocational classes. The lower return for university studies was due to the high costs of the courses, not the effectiveness of the education. Estimates on the cost effectiveness of prison education are typically conservative, as they are unable to measure the indirect savings as a result of fewer victims, and reduced strain on police, judicial and social service systems. Taxpayers save additional money as former prisoners who gain employment pay taxes, are better able to support their families, and are less reliant on public financial assistance.

A 2004 study by the University of California, Los Angeles, found that spending $1 million on prison education prevents about 600 crimes, and the same amount spent on incarceration prevents only 350 crimes. A 2009 study found that in the UK, every £1 spent on prison education saved taxpayers £2.50. The 2013 RAND Corporation study estimated that every dollar spent on education saves taxpayers $4 to $5, and that to break even on the cost of education programmes, recidivism must be reduced by between 1.9% and 2.6%. According to a 2013 article by Glenn C. Altschuler and David J. Skorton in Forbes, given the relatively low cost of education and long-term financial savings "it's hard to fathom why there isn't a national, fully funded prison education program in every [US prison] facility".

== Funding allocation and prevalence ==
Both the availability and rate of participation in prison education programmes, as well as the funding available for programmes, varies greatly around the world. It is often difficult to obtain meaningful data on the amount of funding available for prison education, as the money may not come from a dedicated budget, but rather from a variety of sources. In some cases, each individual prison receives a set amount of funding, and the prison warden must determine how much, if any, is spent on education. A survey in 2012 financed by the European Commission found that out of 31 countries in Europe, the majority reported no change in the budget for prison education over the previous three years. Funding was reported to have decreased for general education in three countries and increased in four. Countries that decreased funding appeared to also have decreases in prison budgets overall, while those that reported increases may have only been a reflection of the growth in prison population and corresponding increase in overall spending. The budget for prison education in Norway increased from NOK 107 million in 2005 to NOK 225 million in 2012. In the US, the rate of spending on prison education has decreased, even though the budget for the prison system overall has increased. In 2010, 29% of prison budgets were allocated to education, the lowest rate in three decades; in 1982, the rate was 33%. Funding for tertiary programmes was reduced from $23 million in 2008 to $17 million in 2009. In Honduras, as of 2012, 97% of the prison system's budget is spent entirely on staff salaries and food, leaving barely any funding for sanitation or other services.

A study in 1994 of 34 countries found that half offered basic literacy programmes to inmates, and one-third a form of education higher than that. In 2004, 27% of US inmates participated in an education course, and in 2005, 35–42% of US prisons were offering tertiary education programmes. As of 2009–10, six percent of inmates in participating US states were enrolled in a tertiary programme. While Kyrgyzstan's Criminal Code guarantees the right to education for inmates, the country's prison system has been plagued with problems since the collapse of the Soviet Union in 1991, including insufficient budgets and training for educational staff. As of 2014, six of the 31 prisons in the country offered vocational education, and 13.5% of inmates overall were enrolled in such programmes. The Bahamas initiated a prison education programme in 1994, which, while successful, only had the resources to be delivered to 10.75% of inmates. As of 1996, only 6% of prisoners in Venezuela had access to education, and many prisons there did not offer education at all.

In 2012–13, 14,353 of Morocco's 70,675 inmates participated in educational programmes, an increase of about 20% on the previous year. Educating prisoners in Morocco is particularly challenging, as about 79% of inmates are illiterate and 46% are on remand. As of 2014, it is compulsory for inmates in South Africa to complete at least Grade 9 of schooling. As of 2017, 50% of inmates at Naivasha prison in Kenya are undertaking formal education, and inmates across the country can complete distance education through the University of London. As of 2016, imprisoned students in Egypt are allowed to complete university degrees, but only those that do not require practical components such as the laboratory work that science degrees would require. Prisoners are also entitled to complete their Thanaweya Amma tests. As of 1992, 440 inmates (1.3% of the prison population) in Egypt were attending secondary or university education. Inspectors from Human Rights Watch were shown classrooms purported to be used for teaching basic literacy at two prisons, though they reported the rooms appeared to not have not been used for some time, and also heard an allegation that inmates were only permitted to access education if they first converted to Islam. Prisoners in Jordan have access to secondary and tertiary education, though female prisoners are typically given access to less educational programmes than men. Roumieh Prison, which houses about half the prisoners in Lebanon, has 12% of inmates enrolled in secondary education and 7% in tertiary education as of 2014. Prisoners formally had access to a wide range of industrial vocational education, however, these programmes were terminated in 1975 due to concerns about manufacturing weapons; as of 2017 the only vocational education offered is computer literacy.

Both the European Convention on Human Rights and the Charter of Fundamental Rights of the European Union state that no person shall be denied the right to education, and the European Prison Rules state the education of prisoners shall "be integrated with the educational and vocational training system of the country so that after their release they may continue their education and vocational training without difficulty". Despite this, prison policy documentation in several European countries does not mention education at all, and the 2012 European Commission survey found that there were 15 countries in Europe (including the UK) with less than 25% of inmates participating in educational programmes. Twenty-one of the countries reported there had been an increase in participation over the last five years, five reported no change and three reported a small decrease. Participation for juveniles was considerably higher; these results were expected as juvenile inmates are generally under the mandatory age for school attendance. Eleven of the countries reported a rate of above 50%, and a further 10 countries reported a rate of over 75%. The survey also found that general education was offered to adult inmates in all prisons in 15 countries, in the majority of prisons in six countries and in less than half of prisons in 10 countries.

In the UK, between 2010 and 2015, the number of inmates studying at university level dropped from 1,722 to 1,079, and the number of inmates studying at GCE Advanced Level had halved. As of 2016, only 16% of those who leave prison in the UK completed an education or training placement. According to a 2014 report, Belarus had 82 correctional centres, five of which were running primary and secondary schooling for inmates and a further 21 of which were offering vocational training.

While inmates may face difficulty accessing education in some European countries, it is widely available or even mandatory in others. In both Germany and the Netherlands, prisoners are required to both work and study while in custody. In 2013, between half and three-quarters of inmates in Germany participated in education programmes. Prison education is considered to be exceptionally good in Norway; by law all inmates must have access to educational courses. Similar laws are in effect in Austria, and Denmark. As of 2017, the European Union is funding a prison school in Jamaica.

In 1996–97, the rate of prisoners undertaking education in Australia ranged from 28% in South Australia to 88% in New South Wales, and averaged 57%. For 2006–07, the national average was 36.1%. A 2014 report found that the decrease in participation was due to the inability of prison educational courses across the country to cope with the growth in the prison population. In 2023–24, the national average was 25.7%. Vocational education had the highest participation rate at 18.0%, and university level education had the lowest at 1.5%. In every state and territory in Australia, the demand for prison education greatly exceeds the available space.

A 1990 investigation by Human Rights Watch which visited seven prisons in Indonesia found that all the prisons offered some form of basic literacy classes, though very little education beyond this level. In two of the prisons, "religious education" was compulsory. In 1991, 561,000 inmates in China attended education courses and 546,000 were awarded a certificate for completing such a course; there were 1.2 million inmates in China in 1991. As of 2016, only one of Singapore's 14 prisons has a school for inmates. Participation at the prison, however, is increasing. In 2015, 239 inmates sat for General Certificate of Education exams, compared to 210 in 2012.

== Opposition ==
Community perceptions of prisons and prisoners were essentially a product of sensationalist media reportage, and the advocates of a commitment to rehabilitation tended to be howled down as 'do gooders' or worse. There was little place for the suggestion that the majority of prisoners might be fairly ordinary people involved in fairly extraordinary circumstances, for whom prison should provide an opportunity to re-establish themselves as citizens and workers on their (inevitable) return to society.

— Senator John Tierney commenting on public opinion to prison education in a 1996 Australian federal government report

Prison education programmes are not without opposition. There is often little public sympathy for prisoners, and the issue is often not given political priority, as there may be few votes to be gained from political support. The lack of support for prison education has been linked to sensationalist reporting on crime, including a disproportionate emphasis on violent offences, perpetuating public fear. This in turn leads to a political desire to be seen as "tough on crime". According to the United Nations General Assembly, the "willingness of politicians" to reflect these fears has led to a "reluctance to embed prisoners' rights to education".

Arguments made against prison education include that inmates do not deserve the right to be educated, doing so is being "soft on crime", and that it is a waste of taxpayers' money. It has also been argued that giving imprisoned people education is "rewarding" them for having committed crimes, and that it is unfair for inmates to receive free education when law-abiding citizens must pay for it. According to criminologist Grant Duwe, the complaint that giving prisoners free education effectively treats them better than regular citizens is valid, though the practice should nonetheless be encouraged due to the significant savings for taxpayers as a result of decreases in crime.

Politicians who have advocated for prison education are often met with opposition from rival parties. In 2014, New York Governor Andrew Cuomo proposed allocating $1 million of the state's $2.8 billion budget for prisons towards a college programme for inmates. The proposal was supported by 53% of voters; however, it faced backlash from lawmakers and the opposition party, with 68% of Republicans opposing it. It was subsequently withdrawn and replaced by a programme that was privately funded instead. In response, three Republican congressmen introduced a bill entitled the Kids Before Cons Act, which aimed to remove Pell grants and federal financial aid for prison education, but the bill was never brought to a vote. Efforts to expand prison education in the Australian state of Queensland by the Labor Party have frequently been opposed by the Liberal Party; in 2016, then Shadow Minister for Police Jarrod Bleijie said that prison "shouldn't be a place where we want to invest all this money into making sure [inmates get] a better education than what our kids are".

== See also ==
- Borstal – Type of youth detention centre
- Incarceration and health
- Index of education articles
- Outline of education
- Politics in education
- Prison-to-college program

== Bibliography ==
- Alzúa, María Laura; Rodriguez, Catherine; Villa, Edgar (2012). "The Quality of Life in Prisons: Do Educational Programs Reduce In-Prison Conflicts". In Di Tella, Rafael; Edwards, Sebastion; Schargrodsky, Ernesto (eds.). The Economics of Crime: Lessons For and From Latin America. University of Chicago Press. ISBN 978-0-226-79185-2.
- Appleman, Deborah (2021). "Prison Pedagody". In Williamson, Peter; Appleman, Deborah (eds.). School, Not Jail. Teachers College Press. ISBN 978-0-8077-7963-7.* Biao, Idowu (2017). Strategic Learning Ideologies in Prison Education Programs. IGI Global. ISBN 978-1-5225-2910-1.
- Bowdon, Melody; Carpenter, Russell G (2011). Higher Education, Emerging Technologies, and Community Partnerships: Concepts, Models and Practices. Information Science Reference. ISBN 978-1-60960-624-4.
- Buntman, Fran Lisa (2003). Robben Island and Prisoner Resistance to Apartheid. Cambridge University Press. ISBN 978-0-521-00782-5.
- Davis, Lois M.; Bozick, Robert; Steele, Jennifer L.; Saunders, Jessica; Miles, Jeremy N.V. (2013). Evaluating the Effectiveness of Correctional Education: A Meta-Analysis of Programs That Provide Education to Incarcerated Adults. Rand Corporation. ISBN 978-0-8330-8130-8.
- Davis, Lois M.; Steele, Jennifer L.; Bozick, Robert; Williams, Malcolm V.; Turner, Susan; Miles, Jeremy N. V; Saunders, Jessica; Steinberg, Paul S. (2014). How Effective Is Correctional Education, and Where Do We Go from Here? The Results of a Comprehensive Evaluation. RAND Corporation. ISBN 978-0-8330-8493-4.
- Dick, Andrew J; Rich, William; Waters, Tony (2016). Prison Vocational Education and Policy in the United States. Palgrave MacMillan. ISBN 978-1-137-56469-6.
- Hughes, Emma (2016). Education in Prison: Studying Through Distance Learning. Routledge. ISBN 978-1-317-14577-6.
- Indabawa, Sabo A.; Oduaran, Akpovire; Afrik, Tai; Walters, Shirley (2000). The State of Adult and Continuing Education in Africa. University of Namibia. ISBN 978-99916-53-33-4.
- International Prison Commission (1900). Samuel J. Barrows (ed.). Reformatory System in U. S. US Government Printing Office.
- Jakobson, Michael (2015). Origins of the Gulag: The Soviet Prison Camp System, 1917–1934. University Press of Kentucky. ISBN 978-0-8131-6138-9.
- Mariner, Joanne; Bochenek, Michael (1997). Punishment Before Trial: Prison Conditions in Venezuela. Human Rights Watch. ISBN 978-1-56432-201-2.
- Mariner, Joanne; Cavallaro, James (1998). Behind Bars in Brazil. Human Rights Watch. ISBN 978-1-56432-195-4.
- McConville, Sean (2015). A History of English Prison Administration. Routledge. ISBN 978-1-317-37318-6.
- Mühlhahn, Klaus (2009). Criminal Justice in China: A History. Harvard University Press. ISBN 9-780674054332.
- Nordic Council of Ministers (2005). Nordic Prison Education: A Lifelong Learning Perspective. Nordic Council of Ministers. ISBN 978-92-893-1147-2.
- Ramsland, John (1996). With Just But Relentless Discipline: A Social History of Corrective Services in New South Wales. Kangaroo Press. ISBN 978-0-86417-829-9.
- Rothman, David J. (1998). The Oxford History of the Prison: The Practice of Punishment in Western Society. Oxford University Press. ISBN 978-0-19-987902-1.
- Sampson, Anthony (2011) [1999]. Mandela: The Authorised Biography. HarperCollins. ISBN 978-0-00-743797-9.
- Simon, Rita James (2001). A Comparative Perspective on Major Social Problems. Lexington Books. ISBN 978-0-7391-0248-0.
- Sherry, Virginia N.; White, John Valery (1992). Prison Conditions in Egypt. Human Rights Watch. ISBN 978-1-56432-090-2.
- Smith, Peter Scharff; Ugelvik, Thomas (2017). Scandinavian Penal History, Culture and Prison Practice: Embraced By the Welfare State?. Springer Publishing. ISBN 978-1-137-58529-5.
- Vorenberg, Elizabeth; Vorenberg, James (1990). Prison Conditions in Indonesia. Human Rights Watch. ISBN 978-0-929692-67-8.
- Weschler, Joanna (1994). Prison Conditions in South America. Human Rights Watch. ISBN 978-1-56432-126-8.
- Weschler, Joanna; Garro, Alejandro (1992). Prison Conditions in Spain: A Helsinki Watch Report. Human Rights Watch. ISBN 978-1-56432-061-2.
