= Monroe Correctional Complex =

Prison in Monroe, Washington, United States

Monroe Correctional Complex (MCC)
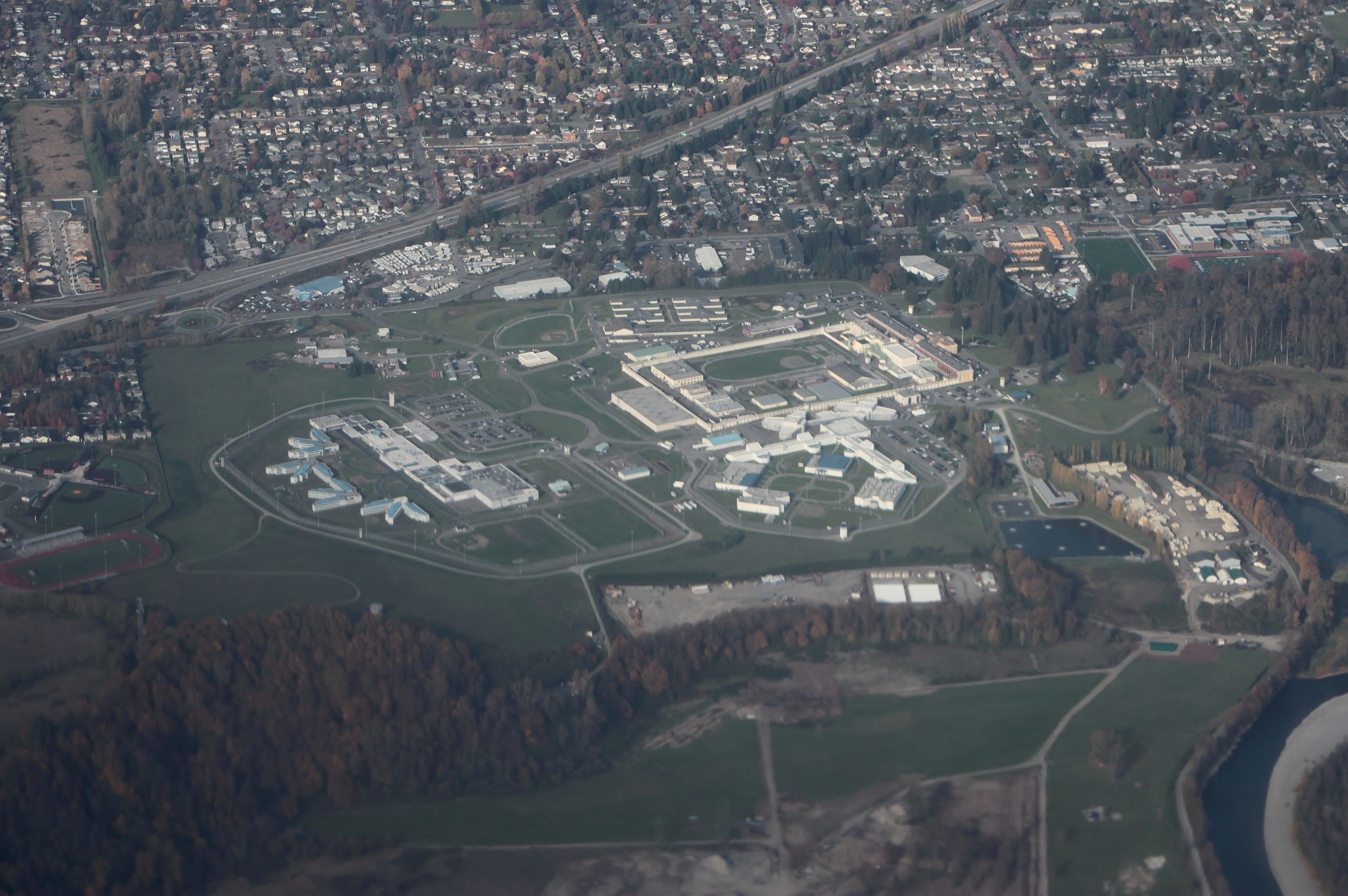
- Aerial view of the complex

- Location in Washington
- Location: Monroe; 47°50′37″N 122°0′7″W
- Status: Operational
- Security class: Level 2 (Minimum 2/Camp), Level 3 (Minimum 3/Long Term, Medium), Level 4 (Close), Level 5 (Maximum, ITU)
- Capacity: 3,100
- Population: 1,497 (October, 2024)
- Opened: 1910 (Washington State Reformatory)
- Former name: Washington State Reformatory, Twin Rivers Corrections Center, Special Offender Center
- Managed by: Washington State Department of Corrections
- Director: Superintendent Jack Warner
- Website: www.doc.wa.gov/corrections/incarceration/prisons/mcc.htm

The Monroe Correctional Complex is a Washington State Department of Corrections men's prison located in Monroe, Washington, United States. With a bed capacity of over 3,100, it is the largest prison in the state.

== Facility ==
Vocational classes offered at MCC include printing, information technology and personal computer support specialist, and inmates can earn a GED while incarcerated. An independent non-profit, University Beyond Bars (UBB), offers college courses as a volunteer organization, and some people incarcerated at MCC have earned associate degrees via Washington statute RCW 28B.50.815.

Class II and III jobs are located within MCC. Class III jobs provide essential services to the facility such as maintenance, janitorial, clerical warehouse workers, and kitchen work. Class II jobs are designed to reduce the cost of goods and services to state agencies and other tax-supported entities. These include laundry services, a print shop, a license tab shop, and the panel program. Class I industries were once housed at MCC, but were eliminated in July 2004 as a result of a Washington Supreme Court decision that held that inmates cannot be employed by private commercial enterprises.

Inmates have access to classification and mental health counselors at MCC, in addition to a wide range of paid and volunteer staff.

== Units ==
Washington State Reformatory Unit (WSRU) - The original prison at the site; construction began in 1907 with inmates from the Washington State Penitentiary and completed in 1910. WSR is the second oldest prison in the state, only to Washington State Penitentiary. WSR has a capacity of approximately 720, and houses minimum, medium, and maximum custody inmates. There are also extended family visit trailers for family style visits with immediate relatives, available to the entire Monroe complex. WSR also has an inpatient hospital on the 4th floor that is classified as Maximum security. The 4th floor hospital is also used by other correctional facilities within the state. Major medical care can often be performed here along with daily dialysis, X-ray, and minor medical procedures, but serious surgical procedures are performed in community hospitals.

Sky River Treatment Center (SRTC) - Formerly known as the Special Offender Unit, is a specialized housing unit within MCC designated for incarcerated individuals with serious mental health needs. Despite its name suggesting therapeutic care, SRTC has been criticized for its use of long-term isolation, limited access to rehabilitative programming, and restrictive conditions that resemble segregation more than treatment.

Inmates housed in SRTC often face barriers to educational and vocational opportunities available in other units, such as University Beyond Bars or GED programs. Public transparency about the unit is minimal, and no official photographs or independent oversight reports are available. Critics argue that the facility prioritizes containment over care, raising concerns about the ethical treatment of vulnerable populations within Washington’s prison system.

Twin Rivers Unit (TRU) - Originally known as the Twin Rivers Corrections Center, the Twin Rivers Unit was opened in 1984. With a population capacity of 800, TRU houses both minimum and medium security levels. The Washington State Sex Offender Treatment and Assessment Program is located at TRU, and those participating in the program are housed there. A 2021 report found report that temperatures of window coverings in sunlight at the facility could reach as high as 98 degrees. That year, the Center was repeatedly under quarantine to contain the COVID-19 pandemic.

WSR-Minimum Security Unit (MSU) - Opened in 1997, the Washington State Reformatory-Minimum Security Unit has a capacity of 470. The MSU has a program housing Mentally Ill Offenders that allows them to transfer to minimum from other security levels. This program is the only one in the state. MSU houses Offenders with less than 6 years to serve.

Intensive Management Unit (IMU) - Opened in 2007, the IMU being Violator Unit and Intensive Management System (IMS) has a capacity of 200+, 100+ of that being designated for probation violators. The IMS houses Offenders that are difficult to manage or are a threat to others.

== History ==
The Washington State Reformatory opened in 1910, making it the second oldest operational prison in Washington state, behind the Washington State Penitentiary. The next facility opened was the Special Offender Unit in 1980. In 1984 the Twin Rivers Corrections Center was opened. It is now known as the Twin Rivers Unit. In 1997 the Minimum Security Unit was opened. In 2007 the Intensive management unit was opened.

During the 2020 coronavirus pandemic, the Monroe complex had eleven positive cases—five staff and six inmates in the same minimum security unit. Over 100 prisoners at the complex rioted on April 8 in response to the outbreak, but were broken up by corrections officers using crowd control tactics and an evacuation of housing units. The following day, Governor Inslee announced plans to release nonviolent offenders and at-risk inmates to lower the risk of infection. One prison guard died of complications from COVID-19 in May after being in contact with an inmate who had tested positive with the disease; his death was treated as being in the line of duty—the third in the facility's history.

On April 26, 2024, 59-year-old inmate Patrick Clay escaped the prison by breaking into an office through its window and stealing the keys to a truck in which he later drove off with. He was apprehended in Seattle four days later. Clay had been serving a two-year-sentence for burglary, criminal mischief, theft and harassment at the time of the escape. He is now facing charges for escape and auto theft.

== Popular culture ==
- The prison scenes in The Butterfly Effect were filmed at the Washington State Reformatory.

== Notable inmates ==
- James Fogle, author of Drugstore Cowboy, the novel on which the film of the same name was based
- Michael Tarbert, Spokane murderer known for killing 12-year-old Rebecca West and 11-year-old Nicki Wood in 1991.
- Glen Sebastian Burns, Canadian murderer known for killing Atif Rafay's family in 1994.
- Atif Rafay, Canadian murderer known for killing his family with Glen Sebastian Burns in 1994.
- Brian Bassett, McCleary murderer known for killing his parents and younger brother in 1995.
- Terence "Terry" Weaver, Blaine murderer known for killing Kelli Scott in 1996.
- Guy Rasmussen, Lakewood murderer known for killing 9-year-old Cindy Allinger in 1996.
- David Anderson, Bellevue murderer known for the Bellevue murders in 1997.
- David Dodge, Stanwood murderer known for killing 12-year-old Ashley Jones in 1997.
- Isaac Zamora, perpetrator of the 2008 Skagit County shootings.
- Gary Grant, killed 4 people between 1969-1971.
- Aaron Ybarra, perpetrator of the 2014 Otto Miller Hall shooting.
- Christopher Havens, founder of the Prison Mathematics Project.

== See also ==
- List of law enforcement agencies in Washington (state)
- List of United States state correction agencies
- List of U.S. state prisons
- List of Washington state prisons
