= Coyote Ridge Corrections Center =

Prison in Connell, Washington, US

Coyote Ridge Corrections Center (CRCC)
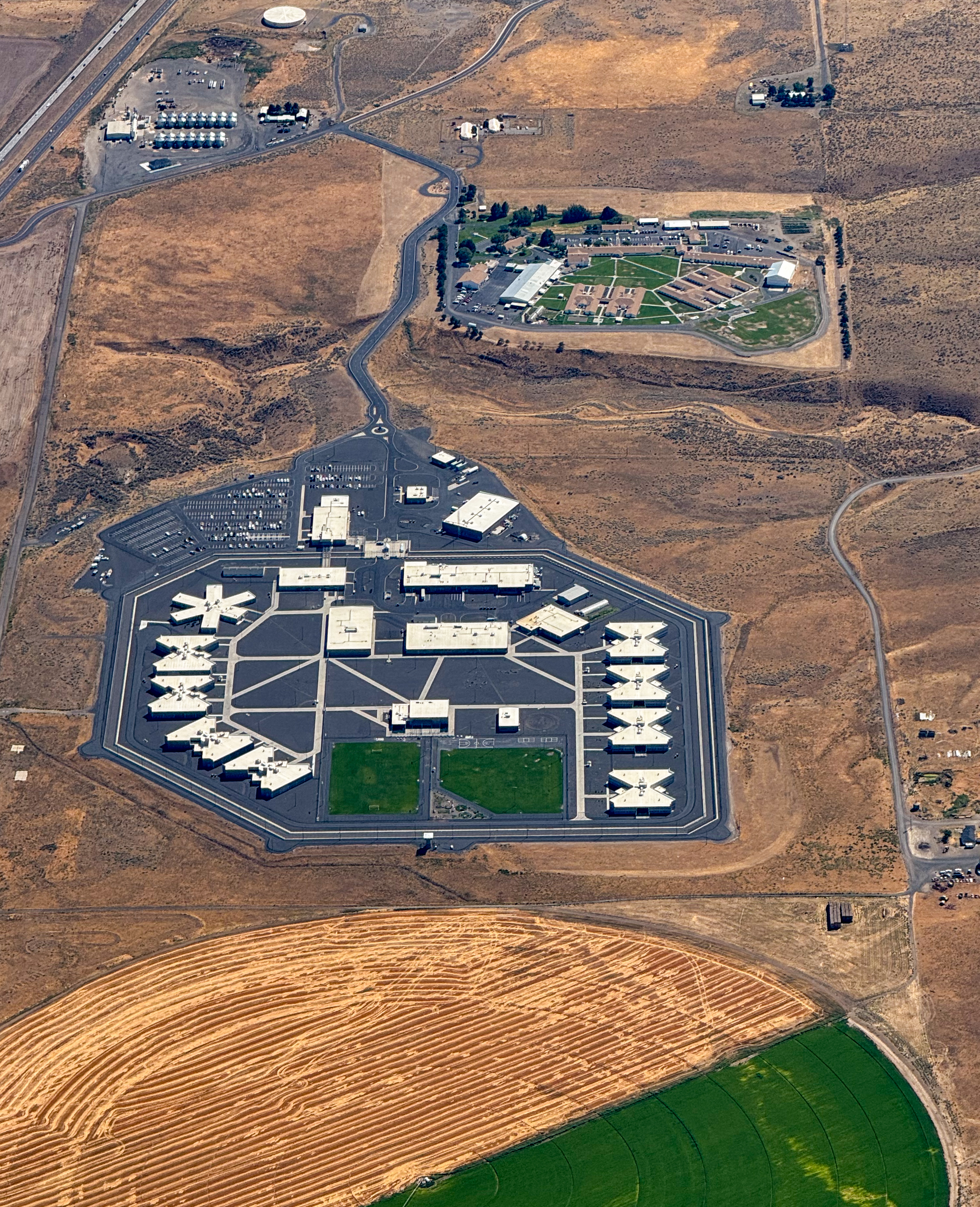

- Location in Washington
- Location: Connell, Washington; 46°40′39″N 118°51′06″W
- Status: Operational
- Security class: Medium, MI3 (Long-term minimum) (MSC); MI2 (Minimum camp) (MSU)
- Capacity: 2,468
- Opened: 1992 (medium security); 2009 (maximum security)
- Managed by: Washington State Department of Corrections
- Website: www.doc.wa.gov/corrections/incarceration/prisons/crcc.htm

Coyote Ridge Corrections Center is a medium security prison located in Connell, Washington. Coyote Ridge is the second largest prison by capacity in the state (the first being the Monroe Correctional Complex at 3,100) and is operated by the Washington State Department of Corrections.

Inmates of Coyote Ridge typically have more than six years up to life to serve. Attached to the main facility is the minimum-security "camp", where inmates must have six years or less on their sentences. The camp buildings look more like those of an average community college, complete with landscaping. Inmates sleep in dormitories, operate a textile factory, and grow some of their own food in a small garden on the grounds. Some inmates are allowed to go off-site to work in highly supervised jobs (including the traditional litter clean up).

The facility was the first prison campus in the United States to achieve LEED Gold certification.

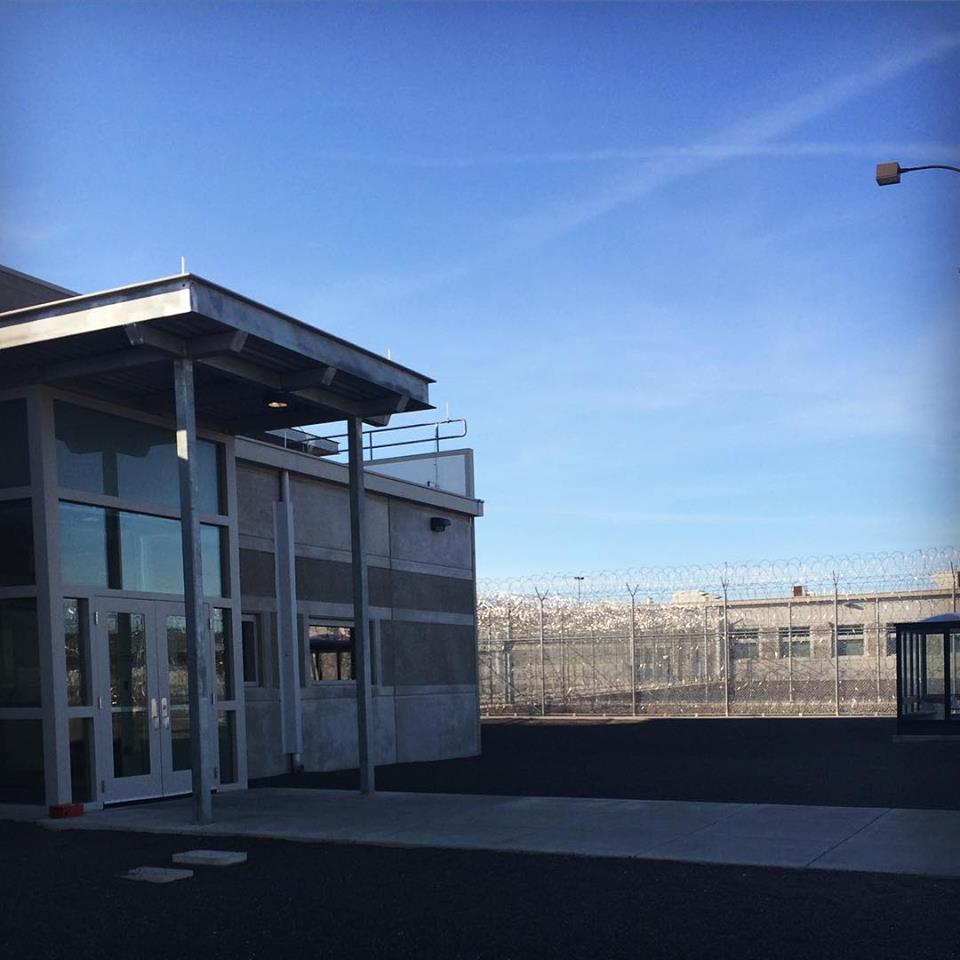
Evening at Coyote Ridge Corrections Center

A majority of the facility's inmates, approximately 1,700 of 2,065, went on a food strike in early 2019 to protest the breakfast menu served to them.

== See also ==
- List of law enforcement agencies in Washington (state)
- List of United States state correction agencies
- List of U.S. state prisons
- List of Washington state prisons
