= Prison Book Program =

Inmate literacy organization

Prison Book Program is an American non-profit organization that sends free books to people in prison. While the organization is based in Massachusetts, it mails packages of books to people in prisons in 45 U.S. states, as well as Puerto Rico and Guam. The program receives letters from people in prison asking for specific titles or genres, which volunteers use to put together a package of books chosen from a small library of donated books. The organization is run out of the basement of the United First Parish Church in Quincy, Massachusetts. Kelly Brotzman, a former professor with a PhD in social ethics from the University of Chicago, currently serves as Executive Director. The organization tracks restrictions that prisons place on books, and advocates for greater access to books in prison. Prison Book Program partners with local bookstores, libraries, universities, and more to collect donated books and spread awareness of book access within prisons.

== History ==
Prison Book Program was started in 1972 by volunteers working out of the Red Book Store in Cambridge, Massachusetts, a leftist bookstore. From 1982-2000, the program was housed in the basement of the Red Sun Press, a print shop in Jamaica Plain. In 2000, volunteers moved to a space in downtown Boston before settling in PBP's current headquarters in the basement of the United First Parish Church in Quincy, Massachusetts in 2004.

== Publications ==
Prison Book Program published "We the People Legal Primer" in 2004 and "Insider's Guide to Jailhouse Law" in 2024.

== See also ==
- Books to Prisoners
