= Room of One's Own =

Room of One's Own may refer to:

- A Room of One's Own, 1929 essay by Virginia Woolf
- Room (magazine), formerly Room of One's Own, a Canadian quarterly literary journal
- A Room of One's Own, a feminist bookstore in Madison, Wisconsin
