= Books Through Bars Philadelphia =

Nonprofit organization in Pennsylvania, U.S.

- Founded: 1990; 36 years ago
- Founder: New Society Publishers
- Tax ID no.: 23-2841845
- Legal status: 501(c)(3) nonprofit organization
- Headquarters: Philadelphia, Pennsylvania, U.S.
- Services: Distributes free books and educational materials to incarcerated people in Pennsylvania, New Jersey, New York, Maryland, Delaware, Virginia.
- President: Dr Tom Haney
- Revenue: $53,129 (2016)
- Expenses: $48,925 (2016)
- Website: www.booksthroughbars.org

Books Through Bars Philadelphia is an American organization that works to provide quality reading material to prisoners in Pennsylvania and surrounding states. Members of New Society Publishers of Philadelphia founded Books Through Bars Philadelphia in 1990. Books Through Bars was separately incorporated as a nonprofit organization on March 19, 2001. There are approximately 30 similar, but unaffiliated, books to prisoners organizations throughout the United States.

Because prisoners in American prisons are not able to receive books from sources other than recognized publishers, bookstores, or other legitimate distributors, those without the financial resources to buy books have very limited access to them. Prison libraries are not being funded, in part because reading material is widely seen as irrelevant to a "mostly uneducated and indeed largely illiterate prison population". New Society Publishers began its program after it began receiving letters from indigent prisoners, and provides donated books to individual prisoners. The organization distributes several hundred packages per month. It also sponsors regular public events relating to issues such as human rights, the war on drugs, and prison reform.

Books Through Bars Philadelphia is a 501(c)(3) nonprofit organization, formally organized as a collective and run by nine core members plus about twenty volunteers, and it is supported by grants from charitable organizations. Books Through Bars Philadelphia is entirely run and operated by unpaid volunteers.
