= Women's Prison Book Project =

Minneapolis volunteer organization

- Abbreviation: WPBP
- Formation: 1994
- Legal status: Nonprofit organization
- Website: https://wpbp.org/

The Women's Prison Book Project (WPBP) is an all-volunteer nonprofit organization that provides free books to women, trans, and nonbinary people who are incarcerated in state and federal prisons across the United States. Established in 199r, the organization is based in Minneapolis, Minnesota.

WPBP is one of dozens of books-to-prisoners organizations in the US, but one of only three that focuses on serving women, along with its sister project Chicago Books to Women in Prison and the NC Women's Prison Book Project.

In addition to sending books to women in prison, the organization aims to educate people about the prison system.

== History ==
Women's Prison Book Project was founded in 1994 in Minneapolis, and incorporated as a nonprofit in Minnesota in 2000. The organization was initially located in the basement of a volunteer. Since then, it has been located at several places in Minneapolis, including Arise Bookstore, Boneshaker Books, SOCO Commons, and Center of Belonging.

For the organization's 25th anniversary in 2019, WPBP brought journalist and activist Victoria Law, author of Resistance Behind Bars: The Struggles of Incarcerated Women (2009, 2012), to the Twin Cities for several events.

WPBP was named a Changemaker by Minnesota Women's Press in 2004.

== Sourcing books ==
Women's Prison Book Project relies on donated books. The organization holds book drives and accepts donated books from community members, bookstores, and community organizations.

The organization partners with several local bookstores to collect donated books, including Magers & Quinn, Black Garnet Books, Moon Palace Books, and Boneshaker Bookstore.

WPBP also receives financial donations from individuals and community groups - including an annual pancake breakfast - which are used towards postage and books.

== Volunteers ==
WPBP relies on volunteers, who work every Sunday to respond to requests and send books.

WPBP also partners with local organizations, including service learning courses for high school and university students.
