= Wisconsin Books to Prisoners =

American prison literacy program

- Abbreviation: WBTP
- Formation: 2006
- Legal status: Nonprofit organization
- Website: www.wisconsinbookstoprisoners.org

Wisconsin Books to Prisoners is a volunteer-run nonprofit books to prisoners organization which sends books upon request to people incarcerated in Wisconsin. The organization is based in Madison, WI and was founded in 2006. WBTP is affiliated with feminist bookstore A Room Of Ones Own, and is additionally supported by Half Price Books and Voyageur Book Shop.

LGBT Books to Prisoners, also headquartered in Madison, began as an offshoot of WPTP in 2007.

In fall 2024, the Wisconsin Department of Corrections announced that donated used books could not longer be sent to inmates in Wisconsin prisons, sparking controversy.
