= Chicago Books to Women in Prison =

Literature for women prisoners

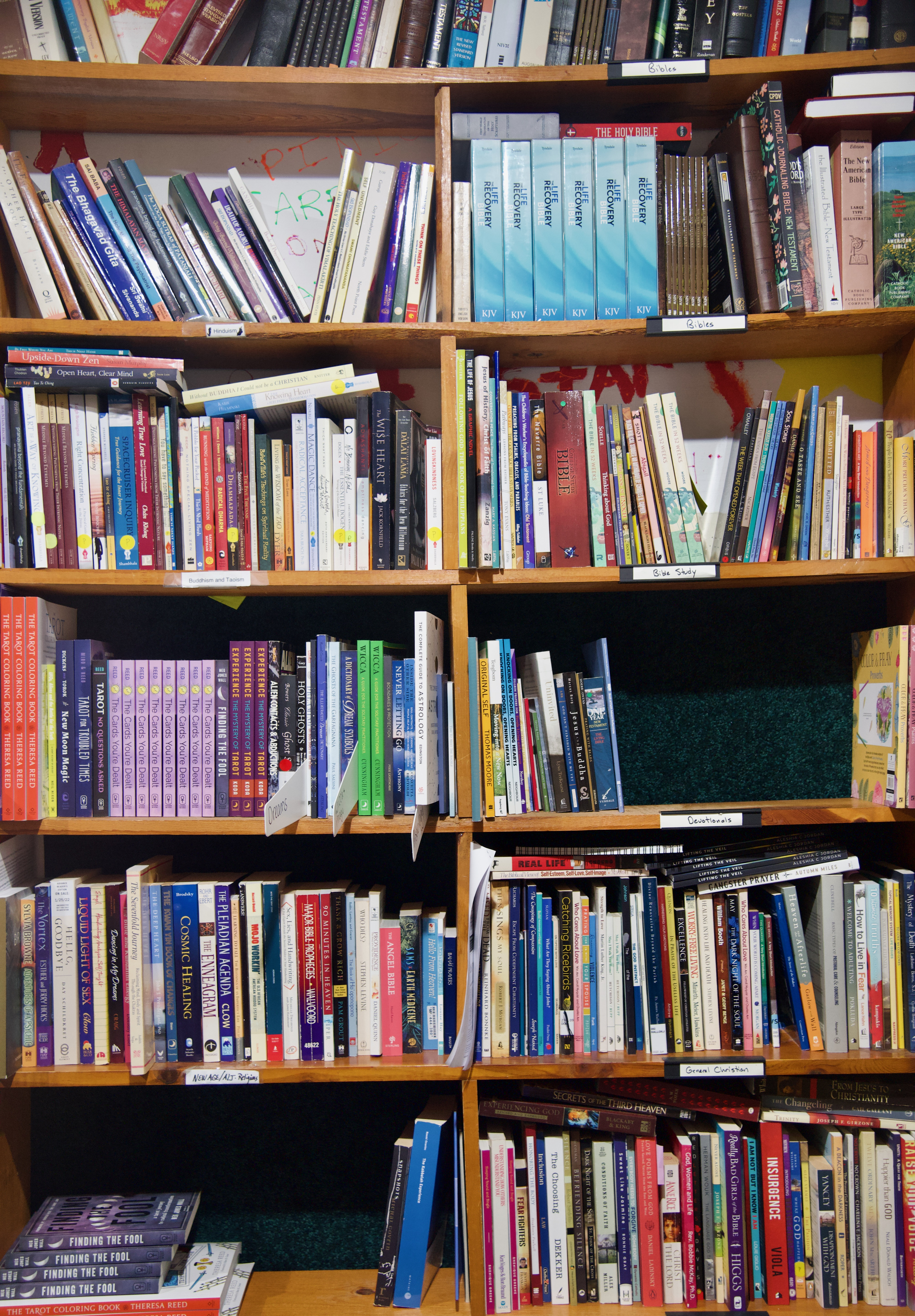
- bookshelves with books about religion at CBWP
- Formation: 2002
- Type: Non-profit
- Legal status: 501(c)(3)
- Headquarters: Ravenswood Fellowship Methodist Church; 4511 N Hermitage Ave, Chicago, Illinois 60640; United States
- Coordinates: 41°57′46.8″N 87°40′19.2″W
- Website: cbwp.org

Chicago Books to Women in Prison (CBWP) is an all-volunteer nonprofit books to prisoners organization that provides free books to incarcerated women in state and federal prisons across the United States. On average, around 3,000 packages are sent per year, pulled from a collection that averages around 10,000 donated books.

== History ==
CBWP was founded in 2002 by a group of book enthusiasts and archivists, including Jack Slowriver, Jodi Ziesemer, Nicole Bussard, and Arline Welty.

With inspiration from the Women's Prison Book Project in Minneapolis, and in an effort to fight back against the cruelties of the penal system while creating a sense of solidarity between people outside and inside, CBWP began as a feminist project operating out of a room in the Haymarket Co-op. Because of the Lewis v. Casey ruling in 1990, which states that prisoners do not hold the right to a law library, many prisoners' access to resources is limited.

== Funding ==
With over half of its expenses going to postage costs, CBWP works with an annual budget of around $30,000. Funding is received from both individuals and grants, and labor is provided from a large group of volunteers. From September 2022 to September 2023, more than 100 people volunteered time with the organization, registering over 2,000 hours of work.

=== Partnerships ===
CBWP holds book drives with and receives support from many organizations, currently maintaining significant relationships with the following:

- Women and Children First: An independent Chicago bookstore that features CBWP on its website, displays a shelf of books people can purchase for CBWP in store, and holds a wishlist for CBWP.
- Da Book Joint: An independent Chicago bookstore that holds a wishlist for CBWP and encourages purchases of books in store to be donated to CBWP.
- Ravenswood Fellowship United Methodist Church: CBWP works out of the basement of Ravenswood Fellowship United Methodist Church.

Previous partnerships included Beyondmedia Education and Bookends & Beginnings.

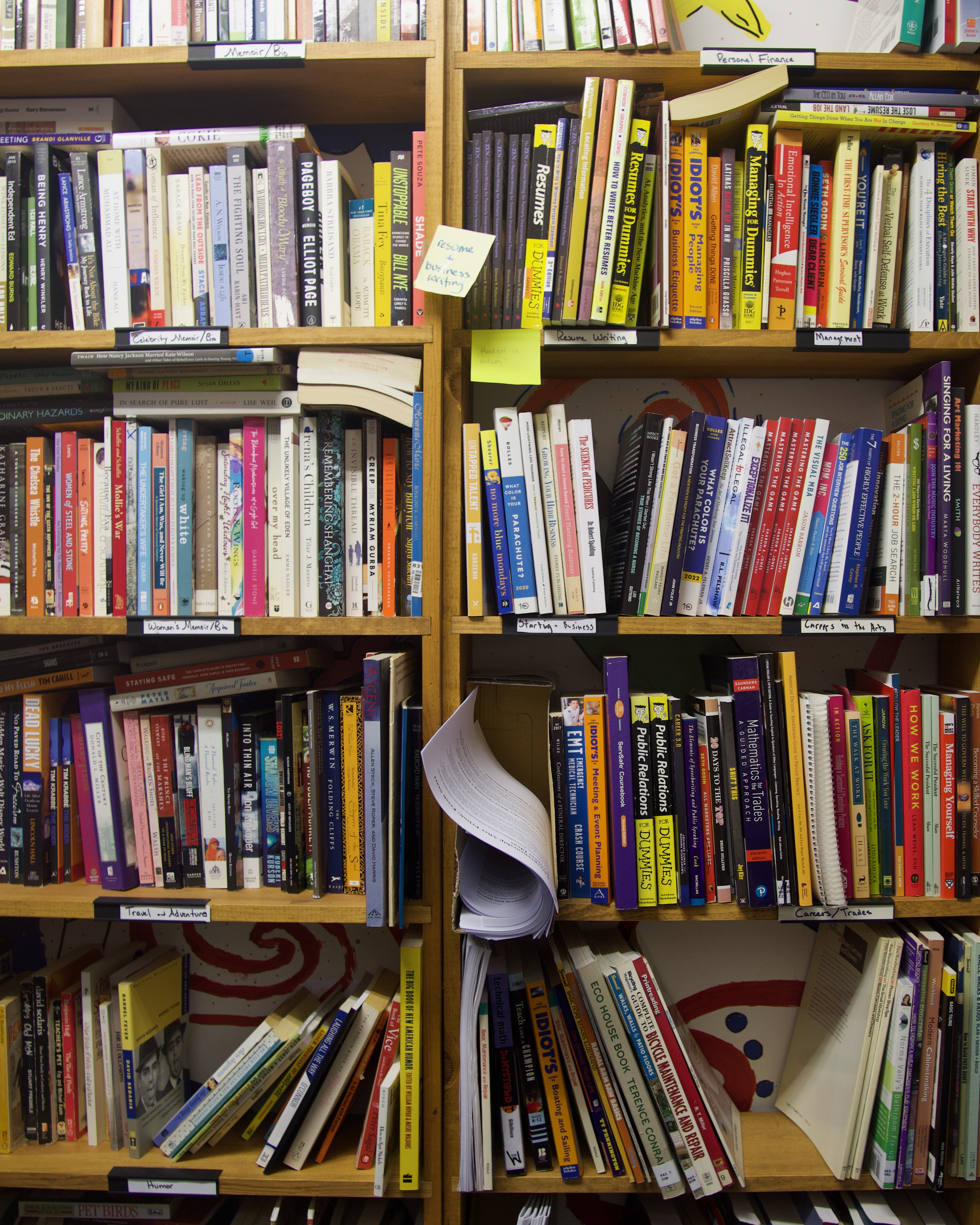
bookshelves with non-fiction books at Chicago Books to Women in Prison

== Book requests ==
A requester can select genres from an order form with over a hundred types of books and will receive three, along with a personal note and an order form to fill out for more books. The collection consists of about 10,000 donated books. The most widely requested books include dictionaries and composition books. Coloring books are also frequently requested, and CBWP sends around 500 to 600 coloring books a year. Many women that are served are mothers and also need of books about parenting while in prison. Although the women served receive new books every 3 to 5 months, frequently they end up sharing many of these book donations with their cellmates, so the books benefit more than just the people who receive them.

On average, the group sends around 3,000 packages per year. In 2017, CBWP donated 4,690 packages averaging up to a total of about 12,000 books. CBWP has a yearly budget of $15,000 made up of the general funding from donations and grants to the non-profit.

== Expansion ==
In addition to women's prison, CBWP sends books to the Cook County Jail as well as transgender women housed in about 20 men's facilities. The organization has expanded throughout the years and now sends books to prisons in multiple states.
