= Books to Prisoners =

Inmate literacy projects and organisations

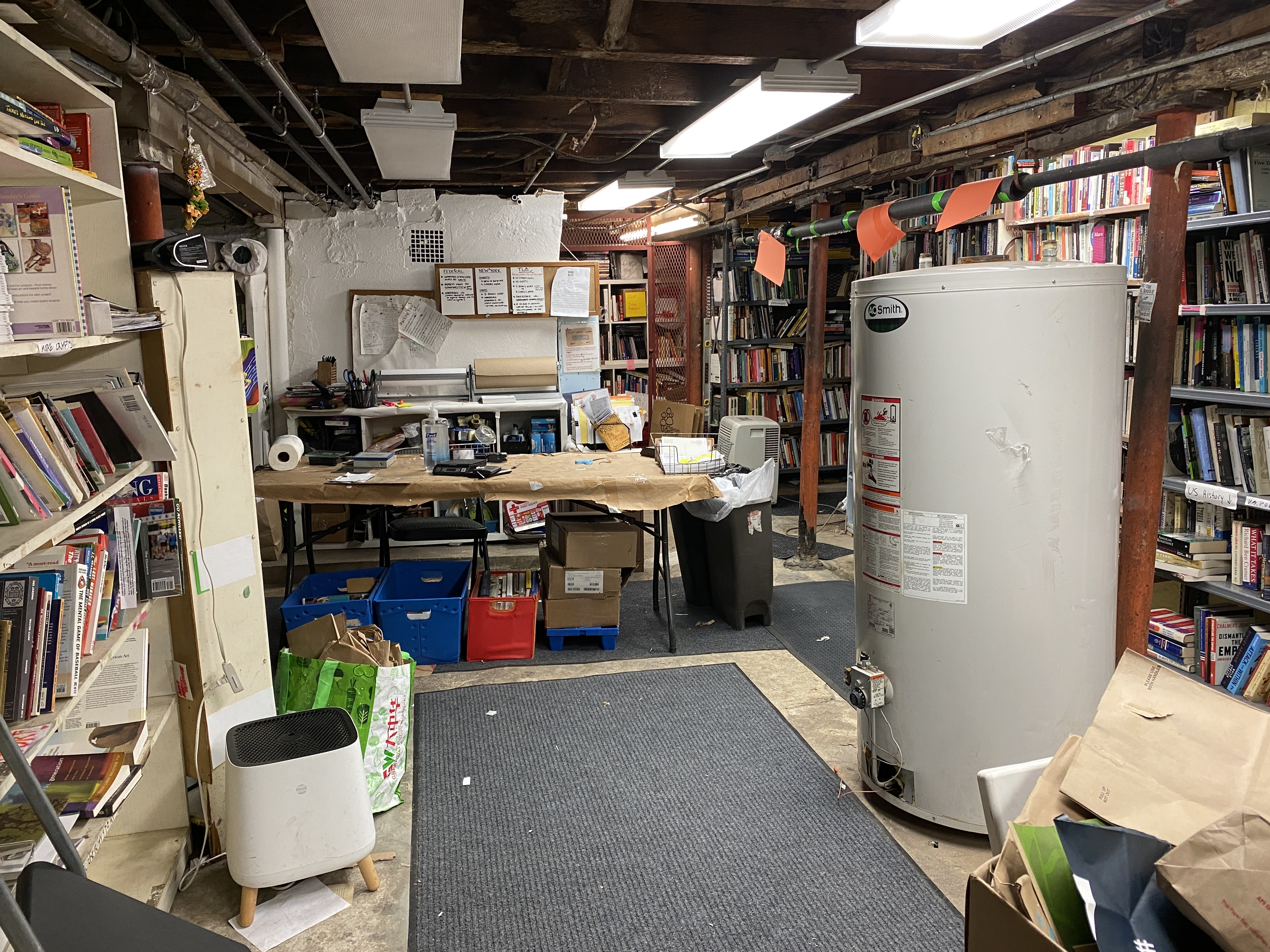
NYC Books Through Bars packing and storage space

Books to Prisoners is an umbrella term for organizations that mail free reading material to prison inmates.

== Background ==
The first Books to Prisoners projects were founded in the early 1970s. These included Seattle's Books to Prisoners, Boston's Prison Book Program, and the Prison Library Project which was founded in Durham, North Carolina, but relocated to Claremont, California, in 1986. Books Through Bars NYC was founded in 1996 as a collaborative project between Blackout Books and Nightcrawlers Anarchist Black Cross, along with prison abolitionist Victoria Law. Since then, dozens of prison book programs have been established, although many have had short life-spans.

Currently there are more than fifty similar projects in the United States, Canada, and the United Kingdom. The groups communicate about common issues and solutions through a listserv created in 2006 and have held national and regional conferences, including a 2003 conference in Philadelphia, Pennsylvania, a 2007 conference in Urbana-Champaign, Illinois, and a 2019 conference in Boston, Massachusetts. In keeping with the anarchist cultural roots of the concept, each group is autonomous though they frequently collaborate on common challenges, especially prison book restrictions and book bans.

Books to Prisoners programs have a diverse range of political affiliations. Many groups identify as anarchist or abolitionist. Others are nonpolitical and simply promote education and literacy. Some are religious. Some groups serve specific populations and focus on gender, sexuality, or race.

Books to prisoners programs generally accept donations of books from publishers, bookstores, and individuals. During the COVID-19 pandemic, when processing donated books was impractical, many groups launched wish lists at independent bookstores where supporters could buy in-demand books which were later sent to prisoners. Each project solicits book requests from incarcerated people, usually by genre or by naming a preferred author. Prisoners find out about the programs through newsletters, resource lists, and word-of-mouth. Often-requested materials include dictionaries, how-to books, sci-fi/fantasy, urban, horror, manga/comics, educational books, and historical works, especially those focusing on African-American, Latino, and Native American history. Project volunteers or workers fill the requests by sending a few books taken from the project's library. There is no cost to book recipients.

Generally, volunteers answer letters, mail packages, and complete administrative work. Many of the projects are affiliated with a local independent bookstore in their home city, which provides a drop-off location for donations and sometimes a small supply of books as well.

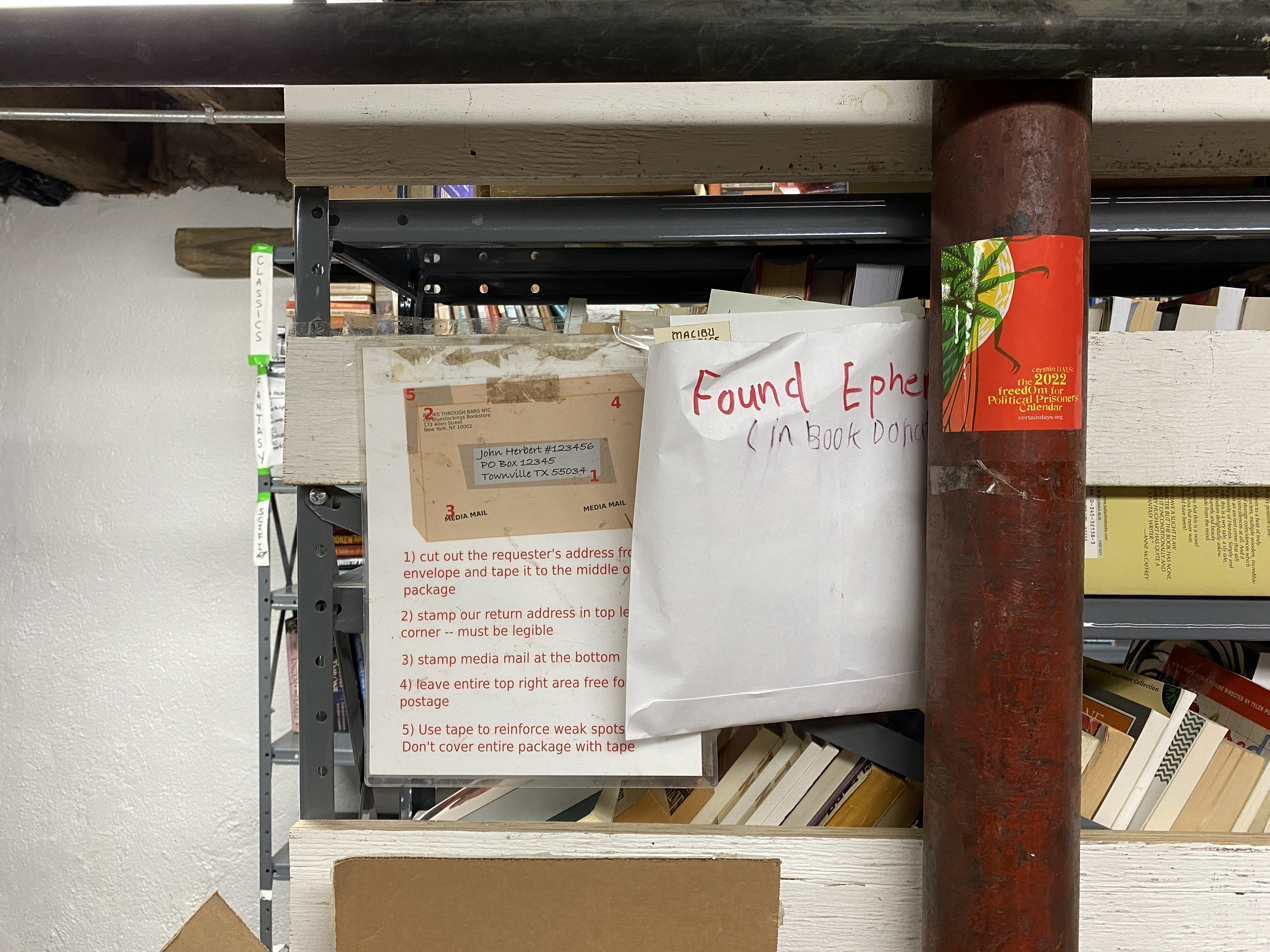
NYC Books through Bars packing instructions

Prison book groups continuously struggle to fulfill their mission in the face of prison book bans, which constitute the largest area of book censorship in the United States. In 2018, Mississippi-based prison book group Big House Books sued the Mississippi Department of Corrections over an all-encompassing ban on non-religious books; the lawsuit was dropped after the Department of Corrections agreed to allow Big House Books to continue sending free books to Mississippi prisons. Also in 2018, the state of New York issued Directive 4911A in an attempt to restrict the books available to prisoners at three of its prisons; after public outcry and media attention, garnered in part through the efforts of New York City-based prison book group Books Through Bars, the directive was rescinded. In 2019, the Washington Department of Corrections banned the shipment of used books directly to prisoners. After facing public criticism and pushback from Seattle Books to Prisoners, the Washington DOC partially backed down and allowed shipments from four BTP programs to continue.

== List of Books to Prisoners organizations ==
There are dozens of Books to Prisoners organizations in the US, Canada, and the UK.

=== US ===
==== Northeast ====
- Great Falls Books Through Bars, Greenfield, MA
- Prison Book Program, Quincy, MA
- Books Behind Bars, Wildwood, NJ
- Books Beyond Bars, New York, NY
- Buffalo Books Through Bars, Buffalo, NY
- CUNY Law Books Through Bars, New York, NY
- NYC Books Through Bars, New York, NY
- Mongoose Distro, Brooklyn, NY
- Prison Books Project, Beacon, NY
- Saxapahaw Prison Books, Brooklyn, NY
- Pittsburgh Prison Book Project, Pittsburgh, PA
- Books Through Bars, Philadelphia, PA
- Providence Books Through Bars, Providence, RI

==== South ====
- Books to Prisons, Birmingham, AL
- DC Books to Prisons Project, Washington, DC
- Gainesville Books to Prisoners, Gainesville, FL
- Open Books Prison Book Project, Pensacola, FL
- X Books, Atlanta, GA
- Louisville Books to Prisoners, Louisville, KY
- Louisiana Books 2 Prisoners, New Orleans, LA
- Big House Books, Jackson, MS
- Asheville Prison Books Program, Asheville, NC
- NC Women's Prison Book Project, Durham, NC
- Prison Books Collective Publishing and Distribution, Carrboro, NC
- Tranzmission Prison Project, Asheville, NC
- OK Prison Books Collective, Tulsa, OK
- Tennessee Prison Books Project, Nashville, TN
- Inside Books, Austin, TX
- Books Behind Bars, Charlottesville, VA
- Virginia Tech Prison Book Program, Blacksburg, VA
- Appalachian Prison Book Project, Morgantown, WV

==== Midwest ====
- Chicago Books to Women in Prison, Chicago, IL
- Liberation Library, Chicago, IL
- Midwest Books to Prisoners, Chicago, IL
- Reading Reduces Recidivism, Carbondale, IL
- Urbana-Champaign Books to Prisoners Project, Urbana, IL
- Midwest Pages to Prisoners Project, Bloomington, IN
- Unitarian Universalist Ann Arbor Prison Books, Ann Arbor, MI
- Women's Prison Book Project, Minneapolis, MN
- Liberation Lit, Kansas City, MO
- Missouri Prison Books, St. Louis, MO
- Lincoln Prison Book Project, Lincoln, NE
- Antioch College's Prison Justice Library, Yellow Springs, OH
- Athens Books to Prisoners, Athens, OH
- Redbird Books to Prisoners, Columbus, OH
- LGBT Books to Prisoners, Madison, WI
- Wisconsin Books to Prisoners, Madison, WI

==== West ====
- Read Between The Bars, Tucson, AZ
- Books for Prisoners at UCSD, San Diego, CA
- Prison Library Project, Claremont, CA
- Prisoners Literature Project, San Francisco, CA
- US Davis Books to Prisoners, Sacramento, CA
- Pages for Prisons, Boulder, CO
- Portland Books to Prisoners, Portland, OR
- Rogue Liberation Library, Ashland, OR
- Books to Prisoners, Seattle, WA
- Books to Prisoners Olympia, Olympia, WA
- Books to Prisoners Spokane, Spokane, WA
- Lopez Island Books to Prisoners, Lopez Island, WA

==== US Territories ====
- US Virgin Is/ St Croix Prison Library Project, Christiansted, VI

=== Canada ===
- Books 2 Prisoners, Vancouver, BC
- Books Beyond Bars, Halifax, NS
- Books 2 Prisoners Ottawa, Ottawa, ON
- Open Door Books, Montreal, PQ
- Prisoner Correspondence Project, Montreal, PQ

=== UK ===
- Haven Distribution Books to Prisoners, London

== See also ==
- Prison library
- Prison literacy
- Prison literature
