= LGBT Books to Prisoners =

American prison literacy program

- Abbreviation: LGBT BtP
- Formation: 2007
- Legal status: Nonprofit organization
- Website: lgbtbookstoprisoners.org

LGBT Books to Prisoners is a volunteer-run nonprofit books to prisoners organization which sends free reading materials to incarcerated LGBT people across the US. The organization is based in Madison, WI and was founded in 2006 as an offshoot of Wisconsin Books to Prisoners.

In over 15 years, LGBT BtP has sent books to over 13,000 people.

LGBT BtP was started by founder and volunteer Dennis Bergren in his home. As the organization grew, in 2013 it relocated to the basement of Rainbow Bookstore Cooperative, where it was based until 2016 when Rainbow closed. Since 2016, LGBT BtP has been located at Madison's Social Justice Center Incubator.

LGBT BtP has partnered with various community organizations, leaders, and educational institutions to raise funds, collect donated books, and raise awareness, including Winona State University, Laura Jane Grace, and Janet Mock.
