= Louisa Adams =

First Lady of the United States from 1825 to 1829

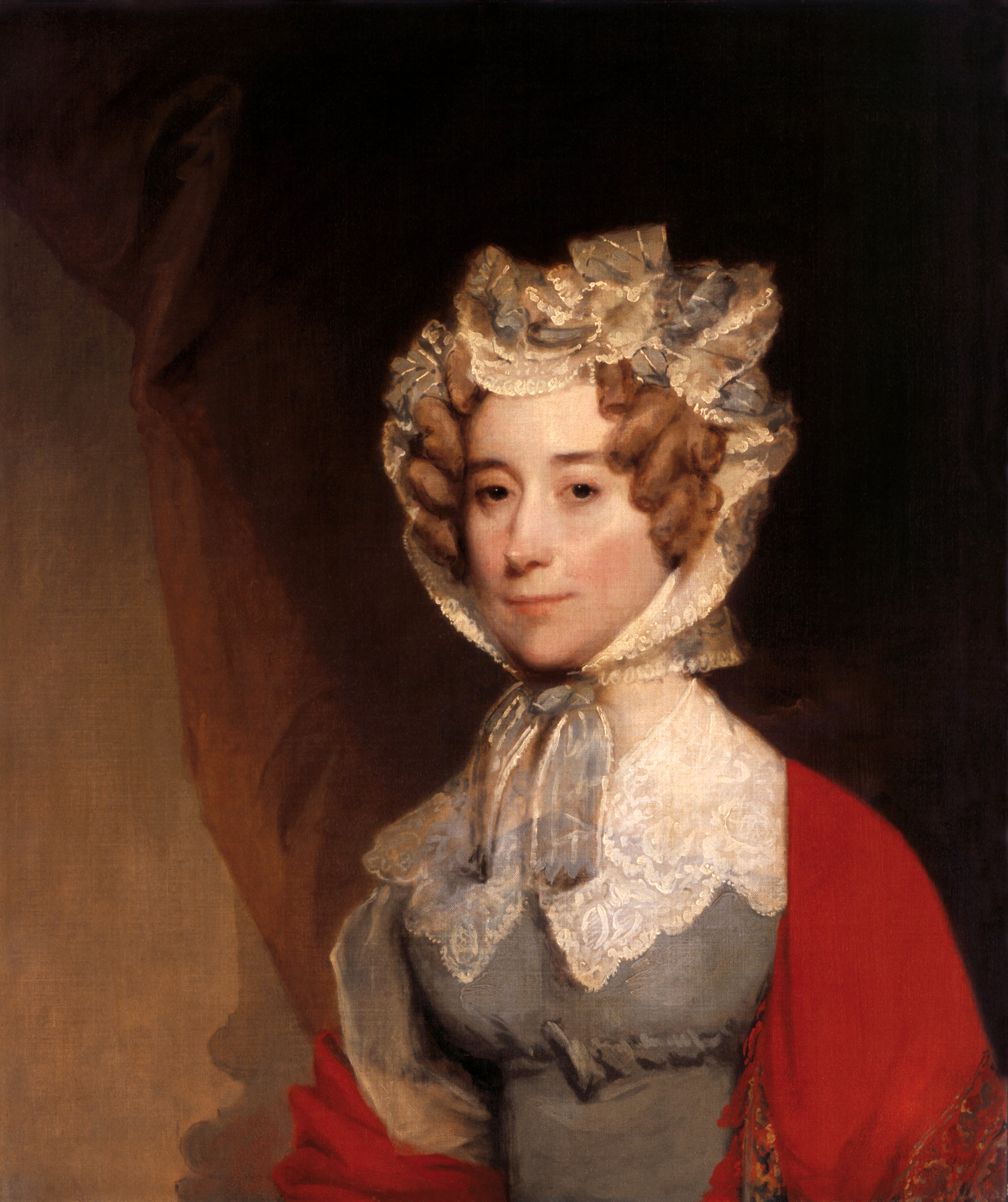
- Portrait by Gilbert Stuart c. 1821–1826

First Lady of the United States
- In role March 4, 1825 – March 4, 1829
- President: John Quincy Adams
- Preceded by: Elizabeth Monroe
- Succeeded by: Emily Donelson (acting)

Personal details
- Born: Louisa Catherine Johnson; February 12, 1775 London, England
- Died: May 15, 1852 (aged 77) Washington, D.C., U.S.
- Resting place: United First Parish Church
- Spouse: John Quincy Adams (m. 1797; died 1848)
- Children: 5, including George, John II and Charles

Louisa Catherine Adams (née Johnson; February 12, 1775 – May 15, 1852) was the first lady of the United States from 1825 to 1829 during the presidency of her husband John Quincy Adams. She is the first foreign born first lady, the only other being Melania Trump who assumed the role in 2017 and 2025.

She was born in London to a diplomatic consulate of Maryland. As she was born before the Declaration of Independence, she was a citizen of the British Empire. Her father was an influential American merchant, and she was regularly introduced to prominent Americans. After her family returned to England, she met John Quincy Adams in 1794, and the two began a tenuous courtship. They married in 1797 after being engaged for a year, beginning a marriage of disagreements and personality conflicts. She joined her husband on his diplomatic mission to Prussia, where she was popular with the Prussian court. When they returned to the United States, her husband became a senator and she gave birth to three sons. John was appointed minister to the Russian Empire in 1809, and they traveled to the Russian Empire without their two older sons, against Louisa's wishes. Though she was again popular with the court, she detested living in the Russian Empire, especially after the death of her infant daughter in 1812. She lived in the Russian Empire alone for a year while John negotiated the Treaty of Ghent. When he asked her to join him in 1815, she made the dangerous 40-day journey across war-torn Europe.

The Adamses lived in England for two years before returning to the United States when John was appointed Secretary of State. Louisa became a prominent cabinet wife and regularly hosted important guests in her home. She worked to build connections for her husband's 1824 presidential run, allowing for his victory. She was unsatisfied in the White House, where she became reclusive and grew distant from her husband. She instead took to writing, producing plays, essays, poems, and an autobiography. She wished for retirement after her husband lost re-election, but he was elected to the United States House of Representatives. She took a more active interest in politics, supporting abolitionism and greater rights for women in society. She was widowed in 1848, and she had a stroke in 1849 that left her with limited mobility. She died on May 15, 1852, at the age of 77, and Congress adjourned for her funeral, the second time a woman was honored in this way.

Her tenure as first lady is not as well studied as other parts of her life, due to her reclusiveness and the limited records she kept at the time. Still, she is generally rated in the upper half of first ladies by historians.

== Early life (1775–1788) ==
Louisa Catherine Johnson was born in London on February 12, 1775. She was the second daughter of American merchant Joshua Johnson and Englishwoman Catherine Nuth. The Johnsons were an influential family in American politics, with Louisa's paternal uncle Thomas Johnson being one of the signers of the 1774 Continental Association. Little is known of her mother's life prior to her marriage. Louisa's parents may have only married ten years after her birth, potentially making Louisa the only first lady of the United States to be born out of wedlock. She lived a comfortable life as a child in which all of her needs were seen to.

Louisa's father supported American independence, and the Johnsons left England in 1778 in response to the American Revolutionary War. They moved to Nantes, France, where they lived for the next five years. While in France, Louisa attended a Catholic boarding school. She performed well in school, becoming proficient in music and literature, and she learned to speak French fluently. She also practiced Catholicism. Such was her immersion in French that she was later forced to relearn English. She was also versed in Greek and Latin. The Johnsons lived in luxury, even when they did not have the financial means to do so. Their home in France was a mansion that came to be known as "The Temple of Taste".

The Johnsons returned to England and settled in Tower Hill, while Louisa was placed in a London boarding school. She was teased for her French mannerisms, and the Catholicism that she had learned in France caused conflict with her Anglican religious education in England. Her self-esteem suffered, and she kept a distance from her peers. She was sent to be educated by John Hewlett, an Anglican minister and a family friend of the Johnsons. Hewlett became a strong influence on her upbringing, encouraging her intellectualism. The Johnsons suffered financially in 1788, and she was pulled out of school to be educated by a governess.

== Marriage (1790–1797) ==
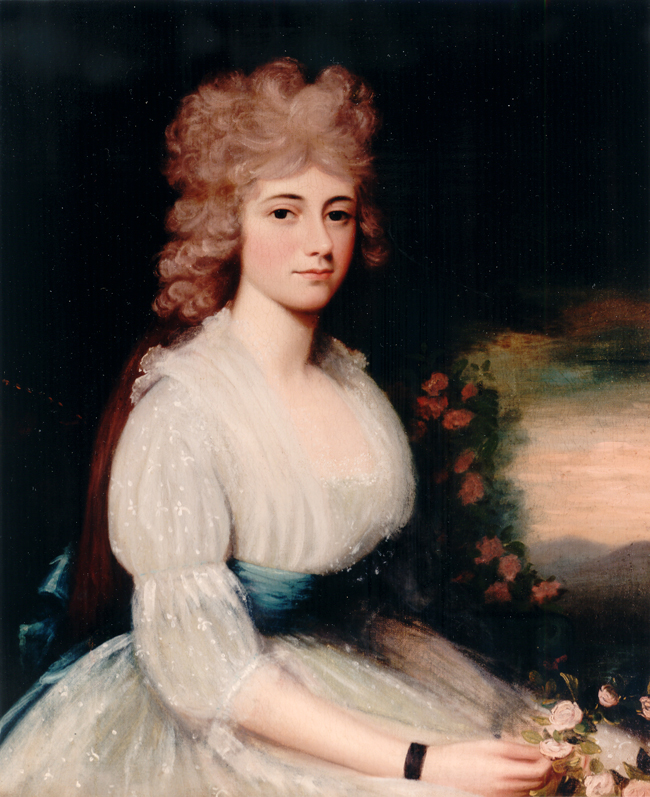
Portrait by Edward Savage, 1794

Johnson's father was appointed the American consul to Great Britain in 1790, and she often assisted in entertaining prominent guests. Among these guests, the Johnson daughters looked for potential suitors, as they were pressured to marry a prominent young man. John Quincy Adams became one such guest in 1795 in his capacity as an American diplomat. He began showing up each day, and only later did the Johnsons realize that he intended to court Louisa, initially believing that his interest was in her older sister Nancy. Only after he complied with a joking request to write her a romantic poem did she consider him a potential suitor.

Johnson and Adams began a courtship, though it was intermittent, and they did not immediately take to one another. Both had previously expressed interest in other potential partners. It was their talents and prestige that eventually drew them to one another. Adams in particular was taken by Johnson's aptitude for singing and music. This pairing also caused a rivalry between Louisa and her older sister, who was jealous for the man she thought would court her.

Johnson and Adams were engaged by 1796, but Adams left England for work and provided a number of excuses as to why he felt they should not be wed, citing his work, his finances, and their personality conflicts. Another factor was the disapproval of his mother, Abigail Adams, who did not wish to see her son marry an Englishwoman. They communicated by letter over the following year, and Johnson came to dread their communications, as Adams's letters were humorless and chastising. Louisa and John eventually married on July 26, 1797, after pressuring from her father. Shortly after the marriage, the Johnsons lost the remainder of their fortune. Louisa's parents fled the country, leaving Louisa and John with little financial support and a mob of angry creditors. The couple disagreed about how much influence a wife should have in her family, and John often made major decisions without consulting her. Both had strong personalities, and their disagreements often became arguments.

== Diplomat's wife (1797–1825) ==
=== Prussia ===
John was appointed American minister to Prussia in 1797, and the couple moved to Berlin. Louisa experienced several miscarriages over the following years, causing poor health that further strained her relationship with her husband. She eventually gave birth to their first child, George Washington Adams, in 1801. She took a prominent role in diplomatic proceedings when she was not ill from pregnancy, and she was popular among the Prussian aristocracy, personally befriending the king and queen. John was recalled from Berlin by his father after Thomas Jefferson was elected president, and the family left Prussia for the United States.

=== United States ===
Adams reunited with her family after arriving in the United States in 1801 while her husband went to his own family home in Quincy, Massachusetts. The journey from Washington to Quincy was interrupted by an uncomfortable dinner with the Jefferson family at the White House and a visit to Martha Washington at Mount Vernon, but it was otherwise long and punishing. Reluctantly, she arrived in Quincy to meet her parents-in-law. While she quickly took to her father-in-law, her mother-in-law remained skeptical of her suitability as a wife.

Adams's father Joshua died in 1802, severely affecting her and leaving the family with no financial support. When her husband was elected to the United States Senate in 1803, she joined him in alternating between Massachusetts and Washington, D.C., much preferring the latter. Unable to afford a home of their own, the family stayed with John's relatives in Massachusetts and with Louisa's relatives in Washington. She gave birth to John Adams II in 1803. She was often left behind while her husband traveled on his own, which she deeply resented. On one such occasion, she suffered a miscarriage. Their third son, Charles Francis Adams, was born in 1807. Her husband resigned from the Senate in 1808, having come in disagreement with the Federalist Party over matters of policy. This disagreement was seen as a betrayal, and the family was thereby excluded from Boston social life.

=== Russia ===
When John accepted the position as American minister to Russia in 1809, he did not consult Louisa. He determined that she would accompany him and that their two older sons would stay behind in the United States. She came to regret these arrangements, feeling that she had failed her sons by leaving them. She blamed and resented her husband for this, causing a rift in their marriage. The 80 day journey to Russia proved unpleasant, and they were constantly wary of French ships that were at war with Russia. Her opinion did not change after arriving in Saint Petersburg, which she found disagreeable, but her husband ignored her desires to return to the United States.

Just as she did in Berlin, Louisa impressed the Russian court and received special attention from the monarch. Unable to afford the elaborate outfits expected of Russian courtiers, she came up with excuses to avoid frequent appearances, first feigning illness and then feigning mourning so that her less formal clothes could be excused. Despite her success, Louisa was unhappy during her time in Russia, as she was separated from her family, regularly ill, and forced to contend with loss. After suffering another three miscarriages, Louisa gave birth in 1811 to her first daughter, and the first American born in Russia, Louisa Catherine Adams II. A year later, the infant died of dysentery, causing Louisa further grief and increasing her resentment against her husband.

When John was called to Ghent in 1814 to negotiate a peace agreement for the War of 1812, Louisa was left in Saint Petersburg, where she would remain for the next year. John learned to afford her a greater level of trust and responsibility while living in Russia, and in December 1814, he tasked her with selling their property in Russia and traveling across Europe to meet him in Paris. She left in February 1815, and for the next 40 days she made the dangerous journey across Europe, which had been ravaged by the Napoleonic Wars, in the cold winter. She was frequently in danger of bandits, and later of French soldiers hostile to her Russian carriage. John and his parents gave Louisa a greater deal of respect after she completed the journey.

=== Return to London and Washington ===
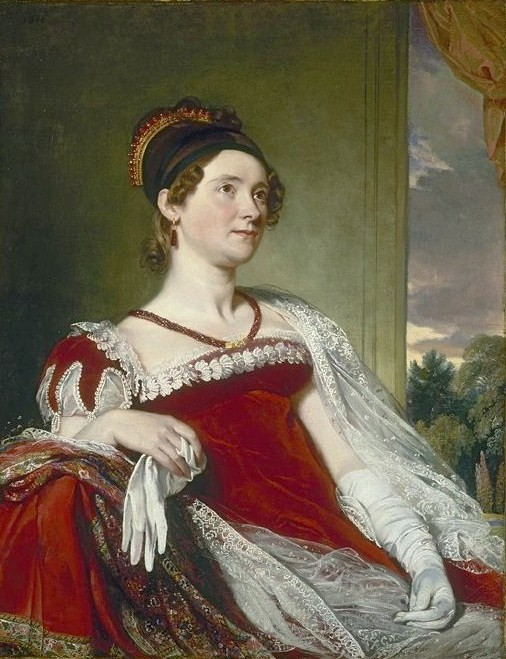
Portrait by Charles Robert Leslie, 1816

Louisa and John returned to London in 1815, as John had been appointed minister to Great Britain. Their children were sent to London as well, and the family lived there reunited for the following two years. Louisa lived more comfortably in London than she had elsewhere; the diplomatic responsibilities were lighter, and she had regular access to an Anglican church. She took on more responsibility in managing the family and assisting her husband in his work, particularly after he suffered a painful eye infection that left him temporarily blinded and an injury to his hand that left him unable to write.

The family returned to the United States when John was appointed Secretary of State in 1817. Louisa found the social politics of Washington distasteful, and she felt that John was too good for it. Despite this, she worked to build political connections for her husband in Washington, hosting a party each Tuesday regularly visiting the wives of influential congressmen. Instead of navigating the complex social rules that had developed in Washington since they last lived there, the Adamses ignored the expectation that they defer to members of Congress in the social hierarchy by calling on them first. The resulting dispute grew to the point that it was addressed by the presidential cabinet. Louisa's relationship with John struggled as he became increasingly occupied by his work, but she finally earned her mother-in-law's respect after returning to the United States, and they shared a friendly reunion. Their close relationship was short-lived, however, as Abigail died in 1818.

As first lady Elizabeth Monroe did not engage in social activity, the responsibility fell to the Adams household to be the social hub of the capital. Louisa's most celebrated accomplishment in this role was the ball that she threw for Andrew Jackson in January 1824, which came to be recognized as one of the city's grandest social events. As John sought the presidency in the 1824 presidential election, Louisa effectively managed his campaign and worked beside him as an equal partner. When the election failed to produce a winner and the result was determined by the House of Representatives, John was chosen through what was criticized as a corrupt bargain, and Louisa shared the criticism that he faced.

== First lady of the United States (1825–1829) ==
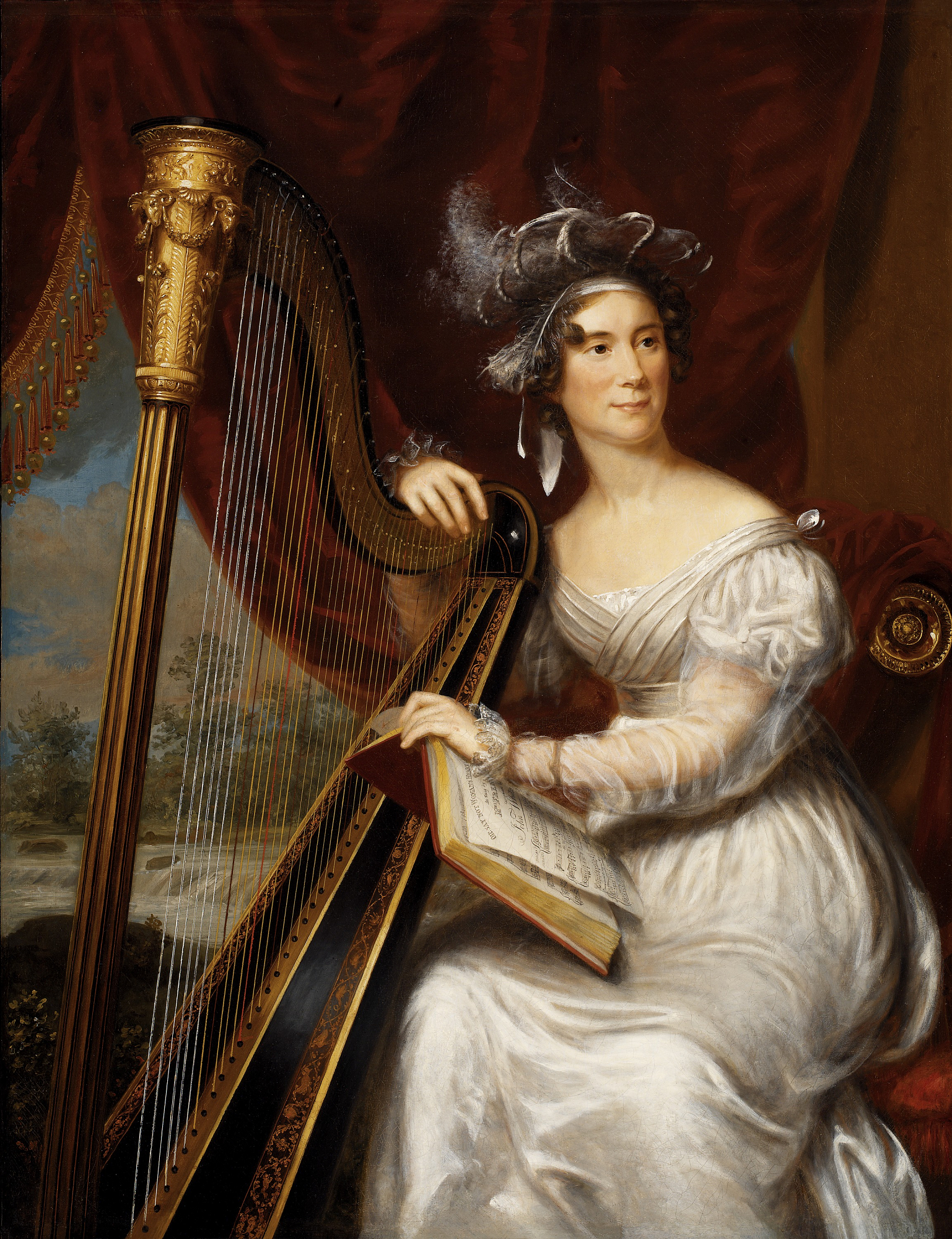
Portrait by Charles Bird King, c. 1821–1825

Upon entering the White House, life became more difficult for the Adamses. The administration was unpopular in Congress and unable to advance many of its policies, invoking a bitterness in John that was often directed toward Louisa. The couple again grew distant as they were affected by the stress of their positions. During vacations, they traveled separately and went long periods of time without seeing one another. Even when separated, they rarely wrote to one another, and the communications they did share were emotionless. Louisa suffered from loneliness while in the White House, which she did not consider a home.

The White House itself was in poor condition when Louisa and John occupied it, as it had never been fully restored after the burning of Washington. Despite this, they were criticized for what the public saw as an opulent residence. Louisa responded to the criticism by holding a public exhibition of the home, which was then criticized as distasteful. Louisa herself became a target in political rhetoric against John, in which she was portrayed as an out of touch European that demanded to be treated as an aristocrat. In response, she published a biography of herself that emphasized her modesty and her American heritage. Though it was published anonymously, she was understood to be the author. It was unprecedented for a first lady, and she was only subjected to increased criticism for the act.

Louisa had always been vulnerable to illness, but her health worsened during her years in the White House, and she was left bedridden on multiple occasions. Even she acknowledged a psychosomatic aspect to her illness. She became less visible as first lady, and even when she did entertain, she often did not attend her own events. She had faced criticism for being more prominent than was expected of a political wife. Instead, she hid from the public, writing plays, poems, essays, and an autobiography. These writings often contemplated the role of women in society as she lamented gender inequality.

Louisa was responsible for making arrangements when Lafayette visited the White House. Louisa's greatest responsibility as first lady came upon the deaths of former presidents John Adams and Thomas Jefferson on July 4, 1826. With the president traveling and Congress in recess, it fell to her to set the social rules for mourning in Washington. She also mourned privately, as she had considered her father-in-law to be a father of her own. Against her husband's wishes, she left the White House and traveled to the Adams family home in Quincy Louisa and John reconciled toward the end of the presidential term in 1828. She again worked to campaign for her husband during the 1828 presidential election, traveling to neighboring states to garner support. She was conflicted, as she was determined to get her husband re-elected, but she also loathed White House life. Louisa and John shared a mixture of despondence and relief when he lost re-election.

== Later life (1829–1852) ==
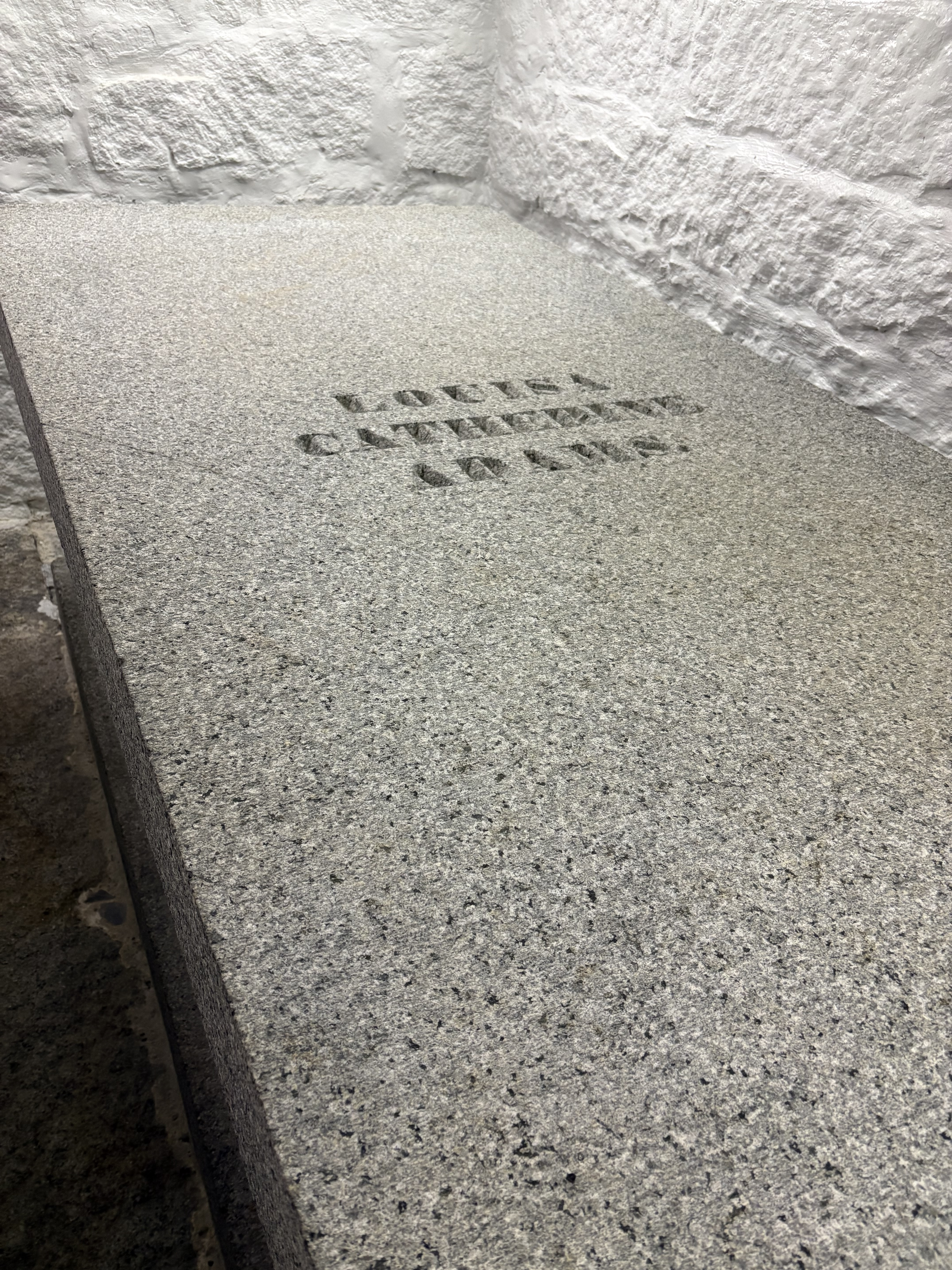
The tomb of Louisa Adams at United First Parish Church.

After leaving the White House in 1829, Louisa and John moved to a home at Meridian Hill. Though the White House was still visible from her doorstep, she felt free from the place. Her reprieve was short-lived, as shortly after she left the White House, her son George fell from a steamboat to his death. He had suffered from extensive personal and financial problems, and it was never conclusively determined whether his death was an accident or a suicide. For the first few months after her son's death, Louisa's focus was on consoling her husband. Her grief overpowered her that August, when a trip to Quincy threatened to take her on the very boat from which George had died. She fell severely ill, and the trip was canceled.

In May 1830, Louisa and John moved to the home on the Adams estate in Quincy. Here her condition improved, as she found a home and the mental and physical toll of her depression subsided. She was upset by John's return to public life when he ran for Congress that year, at first refusing to return to Washington and only giving in after it became apparent that the home in Quincy was not habitable in the winter. She confessed her belief that having her husband in Congress would be a benefit to the country that outweighed her own suffering. After John took office, Louisa took an active role in his political career. Louisa's son John Adams II died of illness in 1834 with financial problems of his own. She blamed her husband in part for the failures and deaths of their two older sons, believing that they could have been given better lives had they not been separated from their parents in their childhood. In her grief, Louisa began writing a new autobiography, The Adventures of a Nobody. Two years later, in improved spirits, she wrote another autobiography covering her journey from Russia to France in 1815, hoping that it would inspire other women.

Though she shared society's dismissive attitudes toward black people, she became an abolitionist, and she supported her husband in his anti-slavery work in Congress. Her position on the matter was even stronger than her husband's, who had aligned with the abolitionists primarily because of his principled opposition to the gag rule against discussing slavery in Congress. Louisa contributed to a fund to free slaves, and she eventually purchased a slave for the purpose of freeing her. Involvement in the abolitionist movement also opened her to feminism. Though she did not accept feminism in its entirety, she began a correspondence with feminist Sarah Moore Grimké and engaged in Biblical studies to challenge the prevailing view that the Bible ordained the subservience of women. She was baptized in the Episcopal Church in 1837.

Louisa was widowed on February 23, 1848, two days after her husband lost consciousness due to a fatal stroke in the United States Capitol. He was 80 years old. She had arrived in Washington to visit him on his deathbed, but as a woman, she was asked to leave as his health failed. She retained her schedule of living in Washington during the winters and Quincy during the summers until a stroke left her infirm in 1849. She was then left in the care of her daughter-in-law Mary. She died on May 15, 1852 at the age of 77. She was the first woman to be honored by an adjournment of Congress for her funeral. She was buried in the Congressional Cemetery, but she was moved to the United First Parish Church shortly after on the initiative of her son.

== Legacy ==
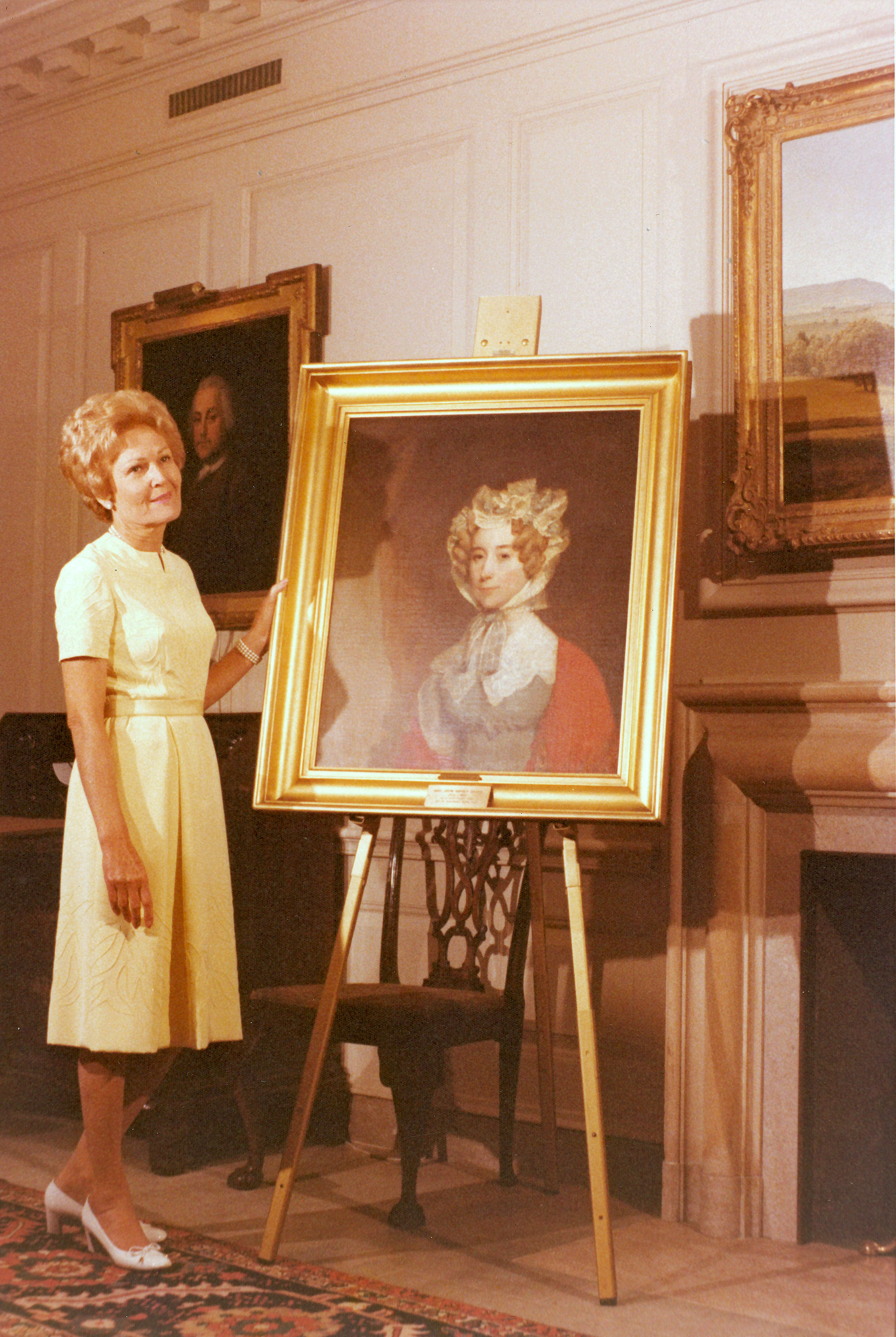
First lady Pat Nixon with Gilbert Stuart's portrait of Louisa Adams in the White House

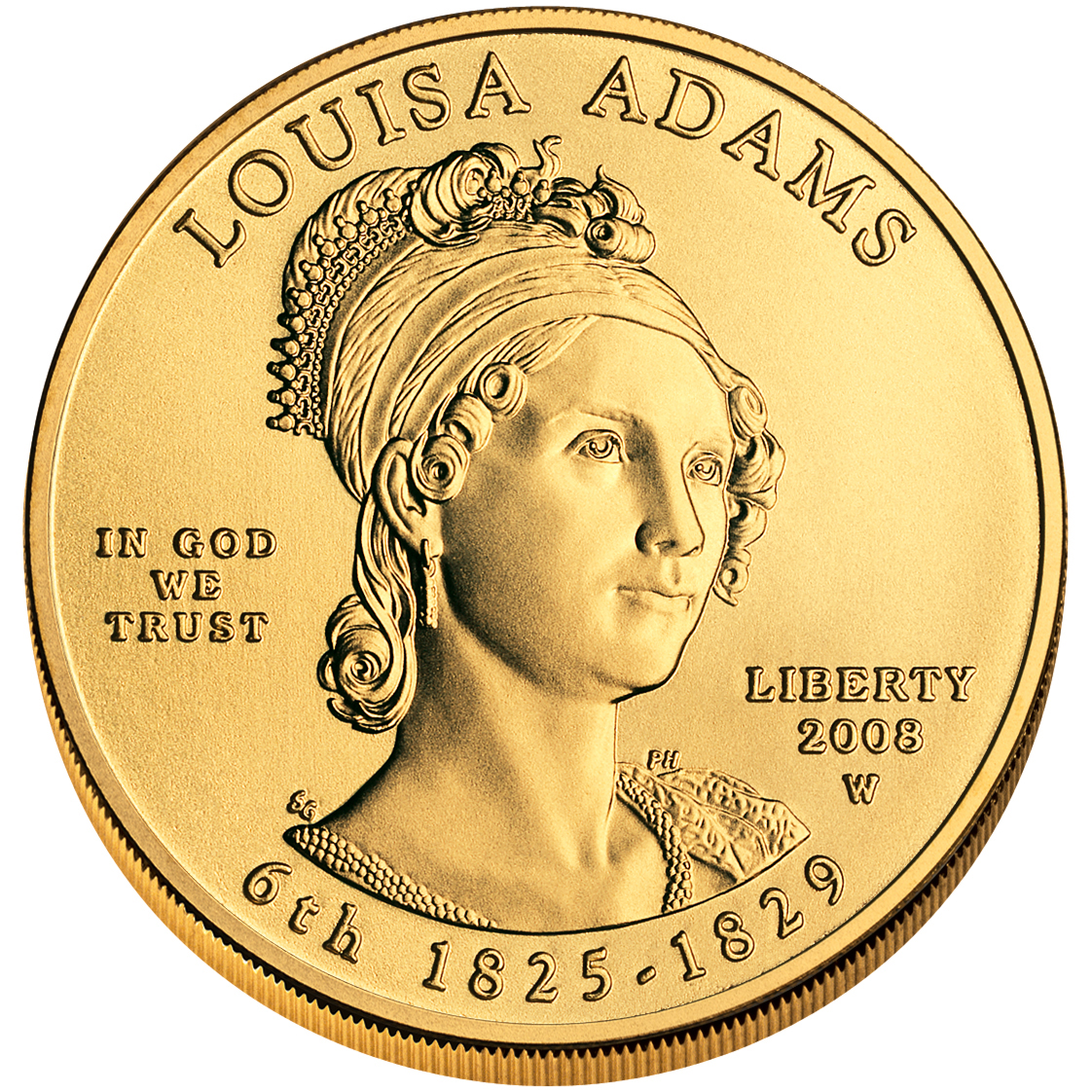
Adams on the 2008 First Spouse coin of the presidential dollar coin series

Adams's role as a first lady has received relatively little scholarly analysis compared to the rest of her life, as she did not keep a diary during her years in the White House. She was reclusive during her tenure, and she did not have significant influence in shaping the role.

Adams was the first foreign-born U.S. first lady, as she was born in England and did not visit the United States until adulthood. She remained the only foreign born first lady until Slovenian-American Melania Trump took the role in 2017. Adams was regarded by contemporaries as the "most traveled woman of her time", and she was the only first lady of the 19th century to travel so widely.

Adams National Historical Park maintains Peacefield, the home Adams and her husband lived in some of the time later in their lives. The park has a bedspread on display at Peacefield which she made, as well as a painting of her by Edward Savage. For some time the painting was still owned by Adams's great-great-granddaughter, Mrs. Henry L. Mason, and was loaned to the museum seasonally. The Smithsonian's National Portrait Gallery holds several portraits of Louisa Catherine Adams, including a silhouette and a portrait on an ivory necklace.

=== Historian polling ===
Since 1982 Siena College Research Institute has periodically conducted surveys asking historians to assess American first ladies according to a cumulative score on the independent criteria of their background, value to the country, intelligence, courage, accomplishments, integrity, leadership, being their own women, public image, and value to the president. Consistently, Adams has been ranked in the upper-half of first ladies by historians in these surveys. In terms of cumulative assessment, Adams has been ranked:

- 14th-best of 42 in 1982
- 16th-best of 37 in 1993
- 12th-best of 38 in 2003
- 21st-best of 38 in 2008
- 18th-best of 38 in 2014
- 16th-best of 40 in 2020

In the 2014 survey, Adams and her husband were also ranked the 19th-highest out of 39 first couples in terms of being a "power couple".

== Family tree ==
Adams family tree

John Adams (1735–1826)	Abigail Adams (née Smith) (1744–1818)
William Stephens Smith (1755–1816)	Abigail Amelia Adams Smith (1765–1813)	John Quincy Adams (1767–1848)	Louisa Catherine Adams (née Johnson) (1775–1852)	Charles Adams (1770–1800)	Thomas Boylston Adams (1772–1832)
George Washington Adams (1801–1829)	John Adams II (1803–1834)	Charles Francis Adams Sr. (1807–1886)	Abigail Brown Brooks (1808–1889)
Frances Cadwalader Crowninshield (1839–1911)	John Quincy Adams II (1833–1894)	Charles Francis Adams Jr. (1835–1915)	Henry Brooks Adams (1838–1918)	Marian Hooper Adams (1843–1885)	Peter Chardon Brooks Adams (1848–1927)
George Casper Adams (1863–1900)	Charles Francis Adams III (1866–1954)	Frances Adams (née Lovering) (1869–1956)	John Adams (1875–1964)
Henry Sturgis Morgan (1900–1982)	Catherine Lovering Adams Morgan (1902–1988)	Charles Francis Adams IV (1910–1999)	Thomas Boylston Adams (1910–1997)

== Select writings ==
=== Autobiographies ===
- The Adventures of a Nobody
- Narrative of a Journey from Russia to France, 1815 – Published posthumously by her grandson in Harper's Magazine and Scribner's Magazine
- The Record of a Life, or My Story

=== Plays ===
- Suspicion, or Persecuted Innocence

=== Poems ===
- To The Raven, 1828

Honorary titles
Preceded by Elizabeth Monroe	First Lady of the United States; 1825–1829	Succeeded by Emily Donelson; Acting
