= A Room of One's Own (bookstore) =

Independent bookstore in Madison, Wisconsin, US

Coordinates: 43.0937°N 89.3442°W

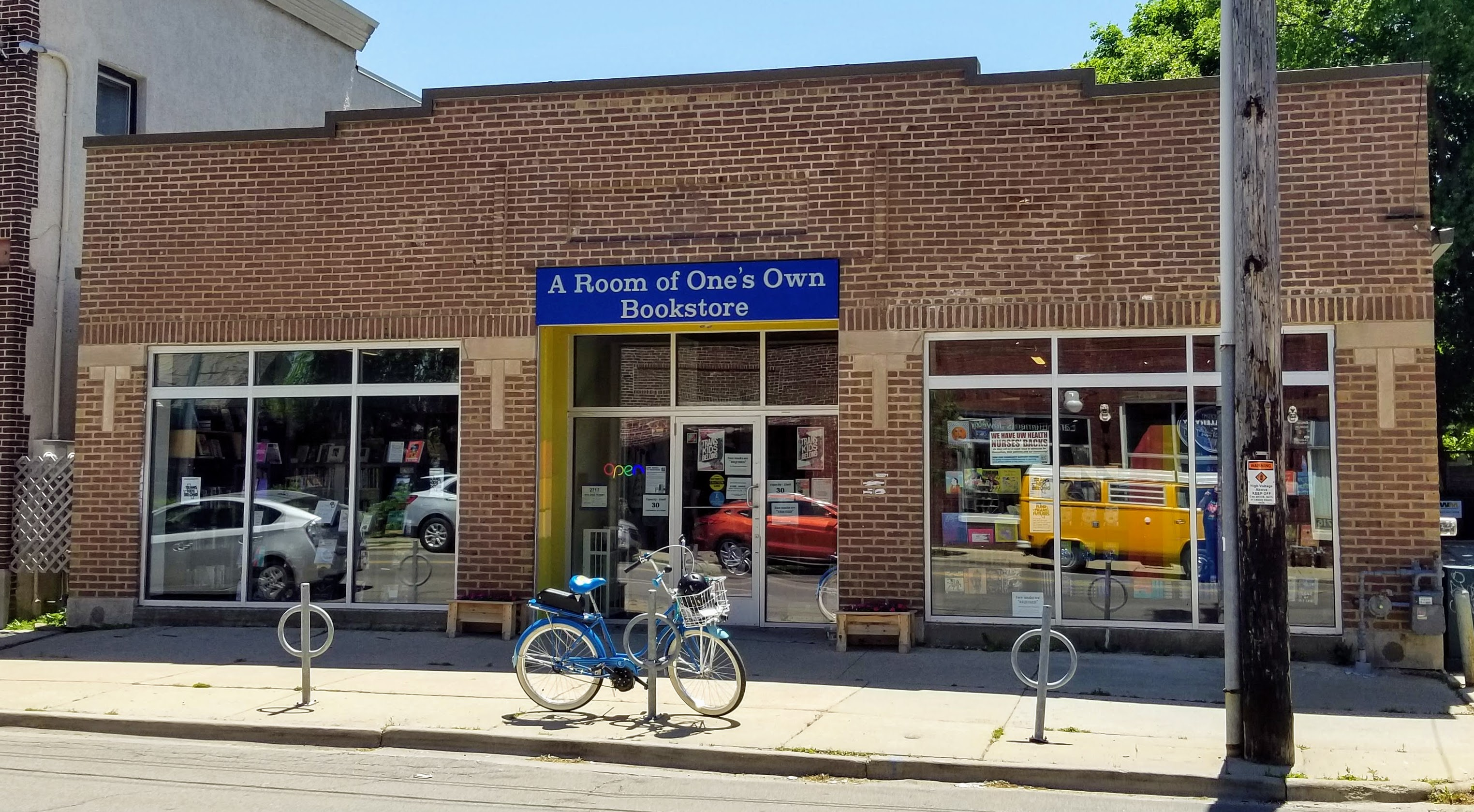
- Type: Book store
- Founded: 1975
- Headquarters: Madison, Wisconsin, United States
- Owners: Gretchen Treu, Wes Lukes, Patrick Rothfuss
- Website: www.roomofonesown.com

A Room of One's Own is an independent bookstore located at 2717 Atwood Avenue in Madison, Wisconsin. The store was founded in 1975 as a feminist bookstore and was named after Virginia Woolf's 1929 essay of the same name. A Room of One's Own carries a broad selection of books, with a focus on works by women and non-binary people and the LGBT community.

== Description ==
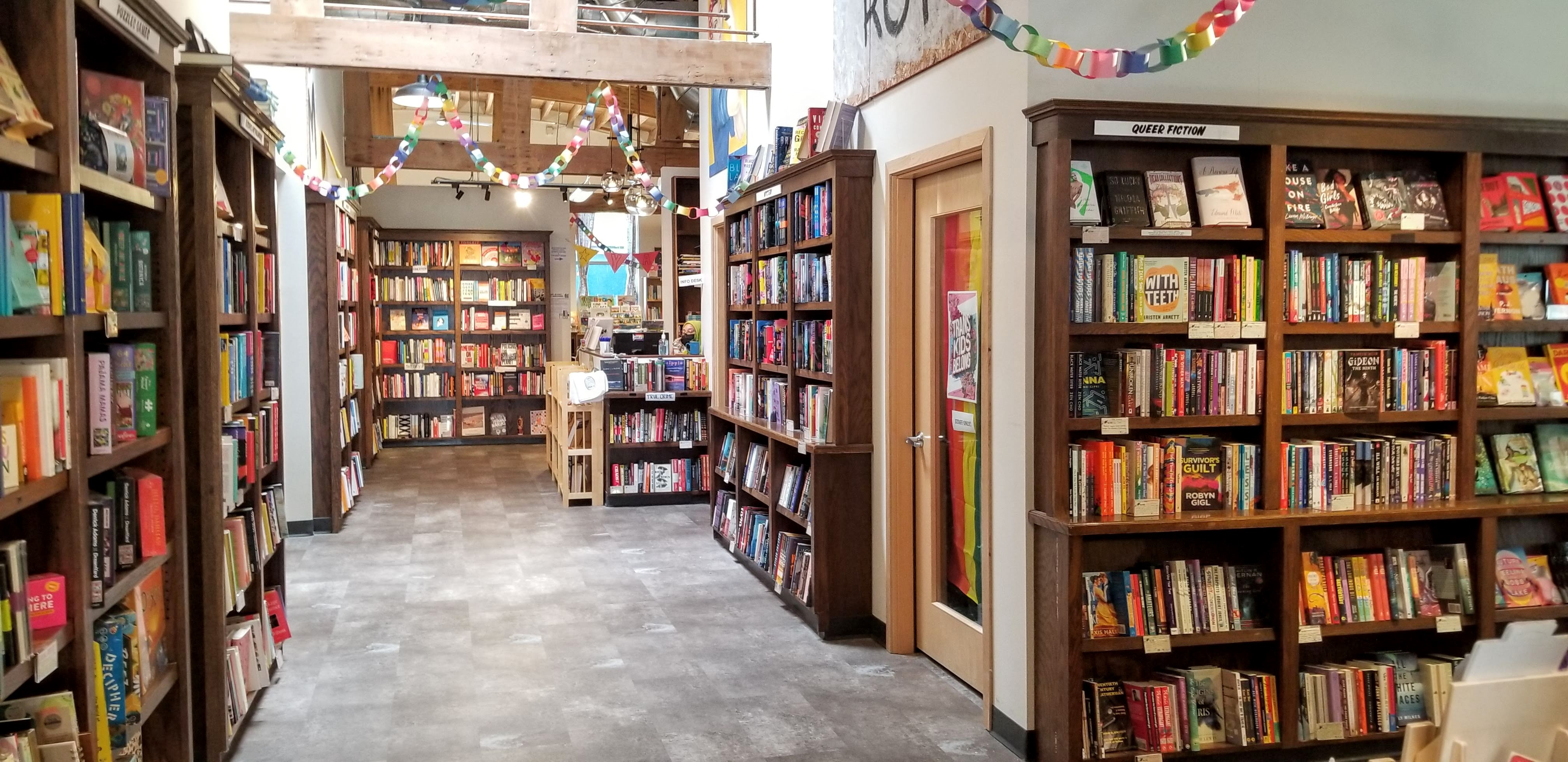
A section of A Room of One's Own

A Room of One's Own specializes in areas such as feminism and gender studies, providing literature for, by and about women, non-binary people, and queer people. With a move to a larger space in 2011, the bookstore broadened its offerings, providing more selection in fiction, children's books, and local history. The store carries around 200,000 titles, with annual sales over one million dollars.

Featuring a robust schedule of author talks and book readings, the store also offers free space for community meetings and events. A Room of One's Own partners with organizations such as the Wisconsin Book Festival.

== History ==
A Room of One's Own was started in 1975 by a group of five women who had recently finished their degrees at the University of Wisconsin: Sandi Torkildson, Moe Doe, Susan Ketchum, Gail Straw, and Sally Stevens. They raised $5,000 to build the store and gathered support from other feminist bookstores in the U.S. The original location was an old printing office at 317 West Johnson Street. In 1997, the store moved two doors down to 307 West Johnson Street; in 2011 the store relocated to 315 West Gorham Street, moving into the 6,000 square foot space formerly housing Avol's Books (and, prior to that, Canterbury Books).

A Room of One's Own was associated with the international women in print movement, which sought to establish alternative communications networks of feminist periodicals, presses, and bookstores created by and for women. The bookstore co-sponsored the 1984 Midwestern regional Women in Print Conference, which was held in Madison.

Owners Sandi Torkildson and Nancy Geary put A Room of One's Own up for sale in June 2016, and in June 2018 they announced the store would be purchased by three partners: two employees, Gretchen Treu and Wes Lukes, as well as fantasy novelist Patrick Rothfuss.

The #BookstoresAgainstBorders campaign was organized by the owners and staff of A Room of One's Own, donating part of their July 2019 sales to nonprofit organization Refugee and Immigrant Center for Education and Legal Services, supporting legal services for immigrants. More than 90 bookstores and publishers across the United States participated in the fundraising campaign. A Room of One's Own was one of the downtown Madison businesses that released statements supporting the protests following the murder of George Floyd in May 2020.

A Room of One's Own was closed for fifteen months due to the COVID-19 pandemic, but continued hosting online events and increased its online orders. In October 2021, the bookstore reopened in a new location, 2717 Atwood Avenue.

== See also ==
- Wisconsin Books to Prisoners
