= United First Parish Church =

Historic church in Massachusetts, United States

- United First Parish Church (Unitarian) of Quincy
- U.S. National Register of Historic Places
- U.S. National Historic Landmark
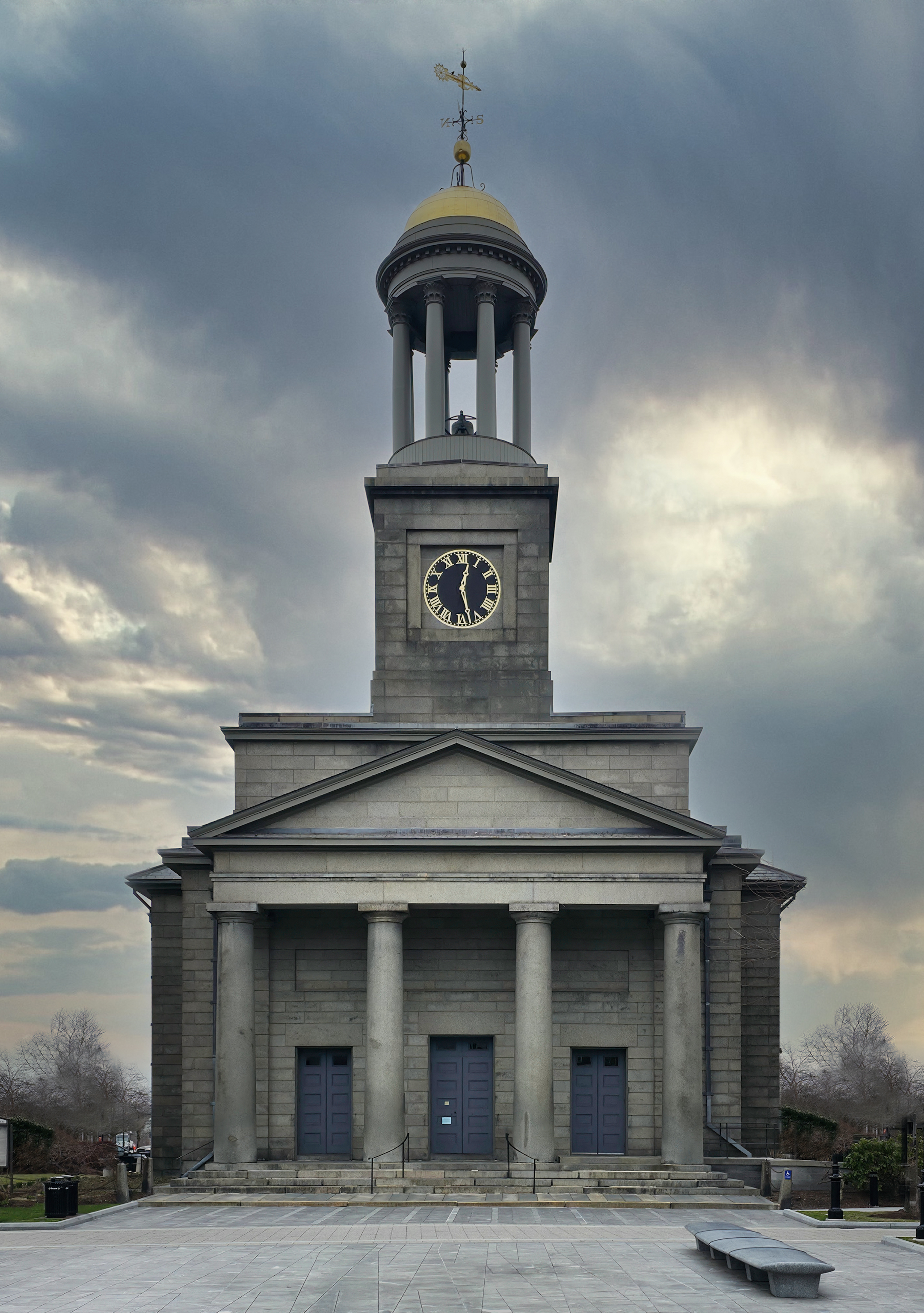
- The United First Parish Church, Quincy, Massachusetts

- Location within Massachusetts Location within the United States
- Location: 1306 Hancock Street, Quincy, Massachusetts
- Coordinates: 42°15′4″N 71°0′11″W
- Built: 1828
- Architect: Parris, Alexander
- Architectural style: Greek Revival
- NRHP reference No.: 70000734

Significant dates
- Added to NRHP: December 30, 1970
- Designated NHL: December 30, 1970

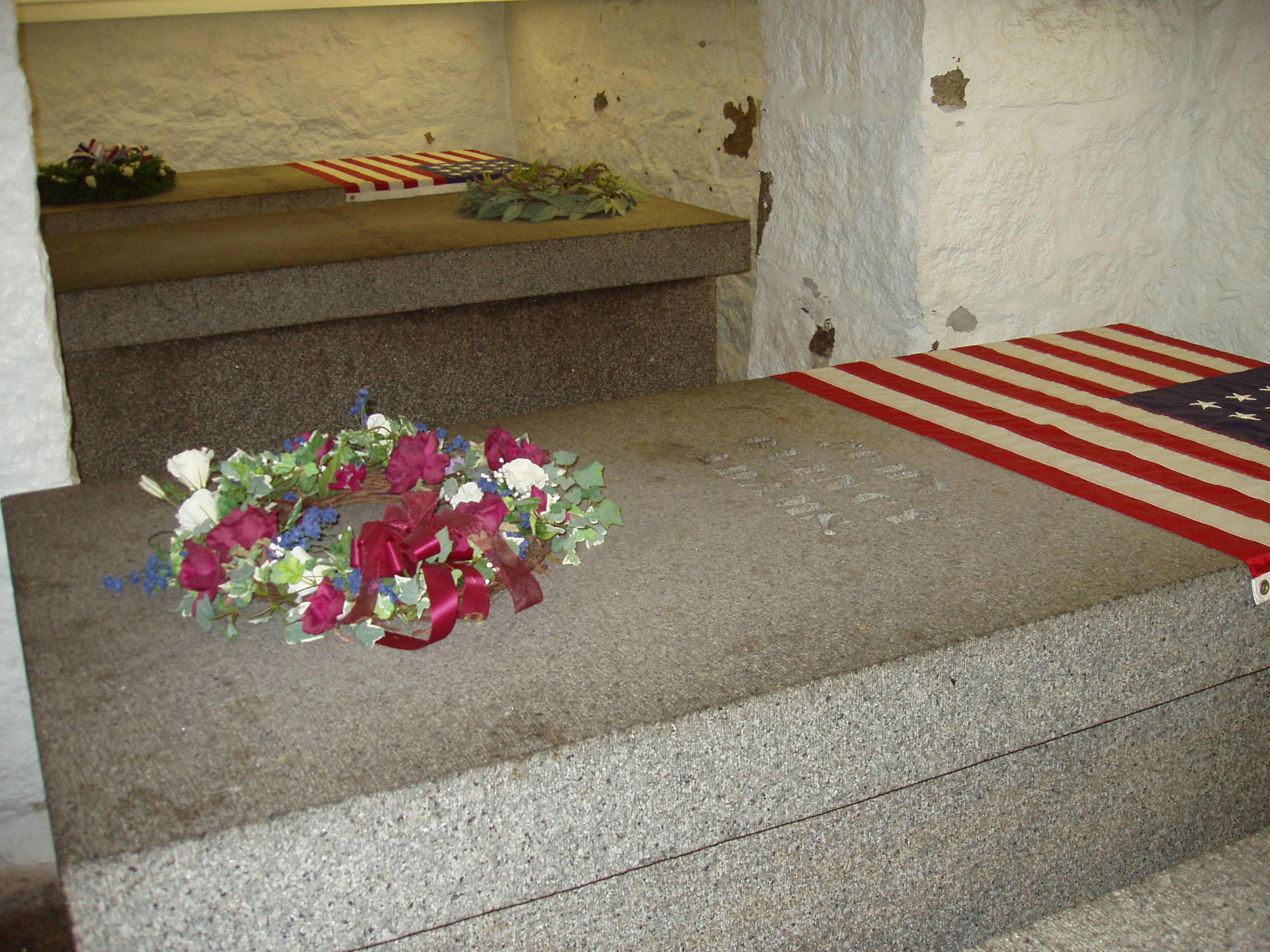
The tombs of Presidents John Adams (left) and John Quincy Adams (right) and their wives, Abigail Adams (middle) and Louisa Catherine Adams (not shown, to the right of John Quincy), in a family crypt beneath the church

United First Parish Church is an American Unitarian Universalist congregation in Quincy, Massachusetts, established as the parish church of Quincy in 1639. The current building was constructed in 1828 by Boston stonecutter Abner Joy to designs by Alexander Parris. It was designated a National Historic Landmark on December 30, 1970, for its association with the Adams family, who funded its construction; four members of the family are buried there.

United First Parish Church is called the Church of the Presidents because two American Presidents, John Adams and John Quincy Adams, attended the church along with their wives, Abigail Adams and Louisa Catherine Adams. All four are buried beneath the church in a family crypt. Pew number 54, used by John Quincy Adams and his family, is marked with a plaque and ribbon on the side.

== History ==
The congregation first gathered in 1636 as a branch of the church in Boston, becoming an independent church in 1639, known simply as "Ye Church of Braintry," because the whole area was then known as Braintree. It was a Puritan Congregationalist church when first established. In the mid-18th century it became Unitarian, and then Unitarian Universalist in the 20th century.

The 1828 church is constructed of locally quarried granite, and is one of the finest Greek Revival church buildings in New England. It has a Greek temple front, supported by four monolithic granite columns which may have been the largest set in the United States at the time. Each column is 25 feet (7.6 m) tall and weighs an estimated 25 tons. Above the main facade rises a two-stage tower. Its lower section is oblong and unadorned, while the second stage is stepped back and square. It has clock faces on each side, and is topped by an open cupola with eight columns and a dome.

American Founding Father and its second president, John Adams, financed the church's construction through a land donation, and the bulk of the granite comes from the Adams family quarry. However, the pillars are from another local quarry, as the Adams quarry was not deep enough for a full-height pillar. Its original bell was cast by Paul Revere, but was melted down and recast as it was not loud enough to serve as a fire alarm. The unusual domed ceiling represents a passion flower surrounded by lotuses. The fine mahogany altar is original.

== Adams' gravesite ==
Both John Adams and his son John Quincy Adams, together with their first ladies, Abigail Adams and Louisa Catherine Adams, are buried in a family vault in the church's basement. Only one other church in the United States contains a presidential tomb: the Washington National Cathedral in Washington, D.C., where the remains of President Woodrow Wilson and First Lady Edith Wilson are interred.

== Prison Book Program ==
Since 2004, the United First Parish Church has hosted the Prison Book Program in the church basement. The origins of the PBP started in 1972, in the Red Book Store Collective in Cambridge, where it disseminated progressive literature, and advocated for the well being of prisoners. It was influential in creating a legal primer, and prison resource list that prisoners can request by letter, along with the other works of literature the PBP offers. The PBP is not associated with the UFPC and is a secular organization, however the UFPC supports the work the PBP does.

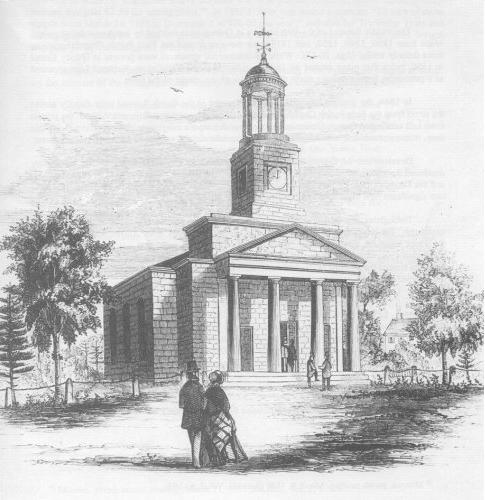
The church as depicted in a c. 1851–1854 engraving

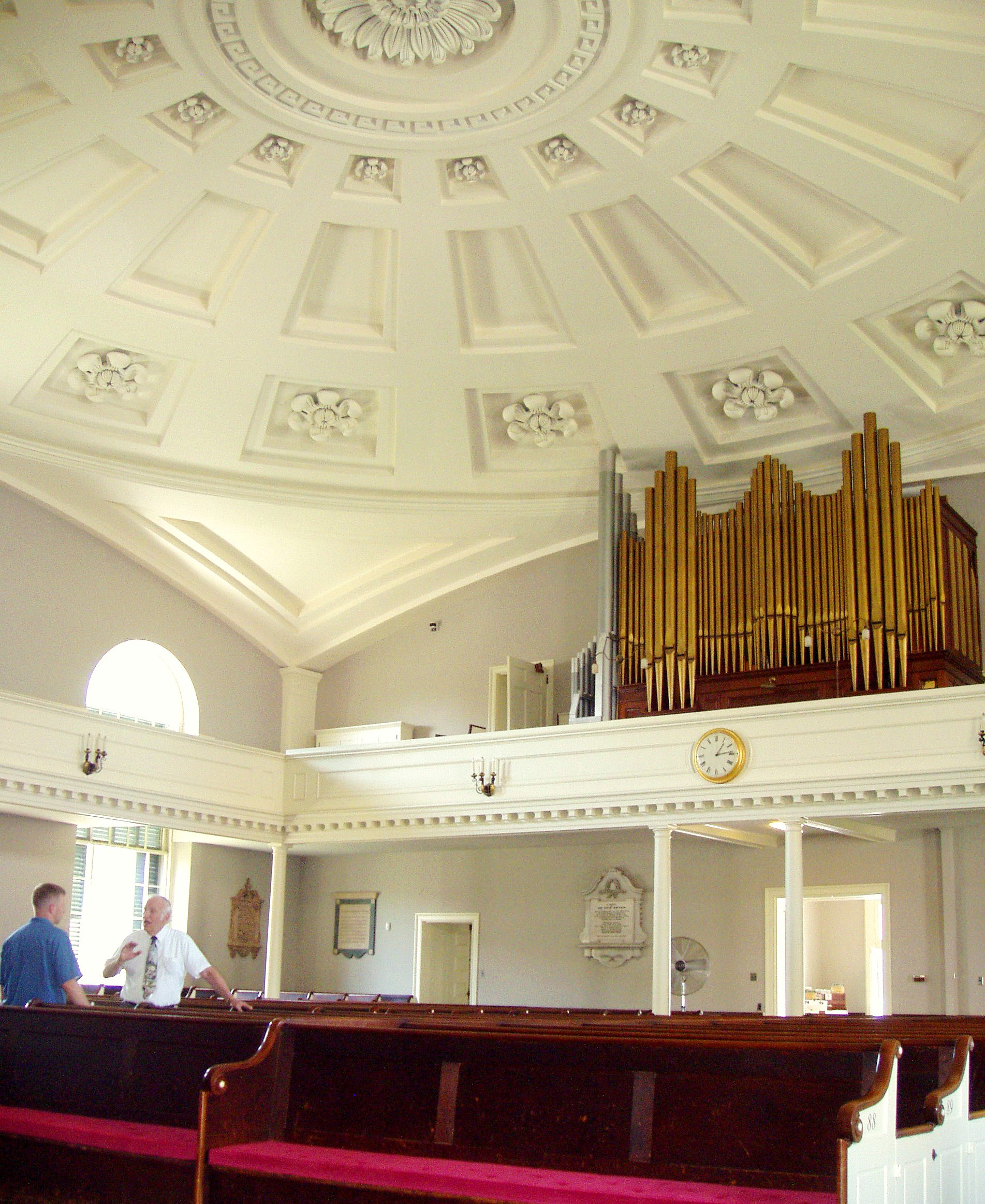
2005 view of the interior and its decorative plaster domed ceiling

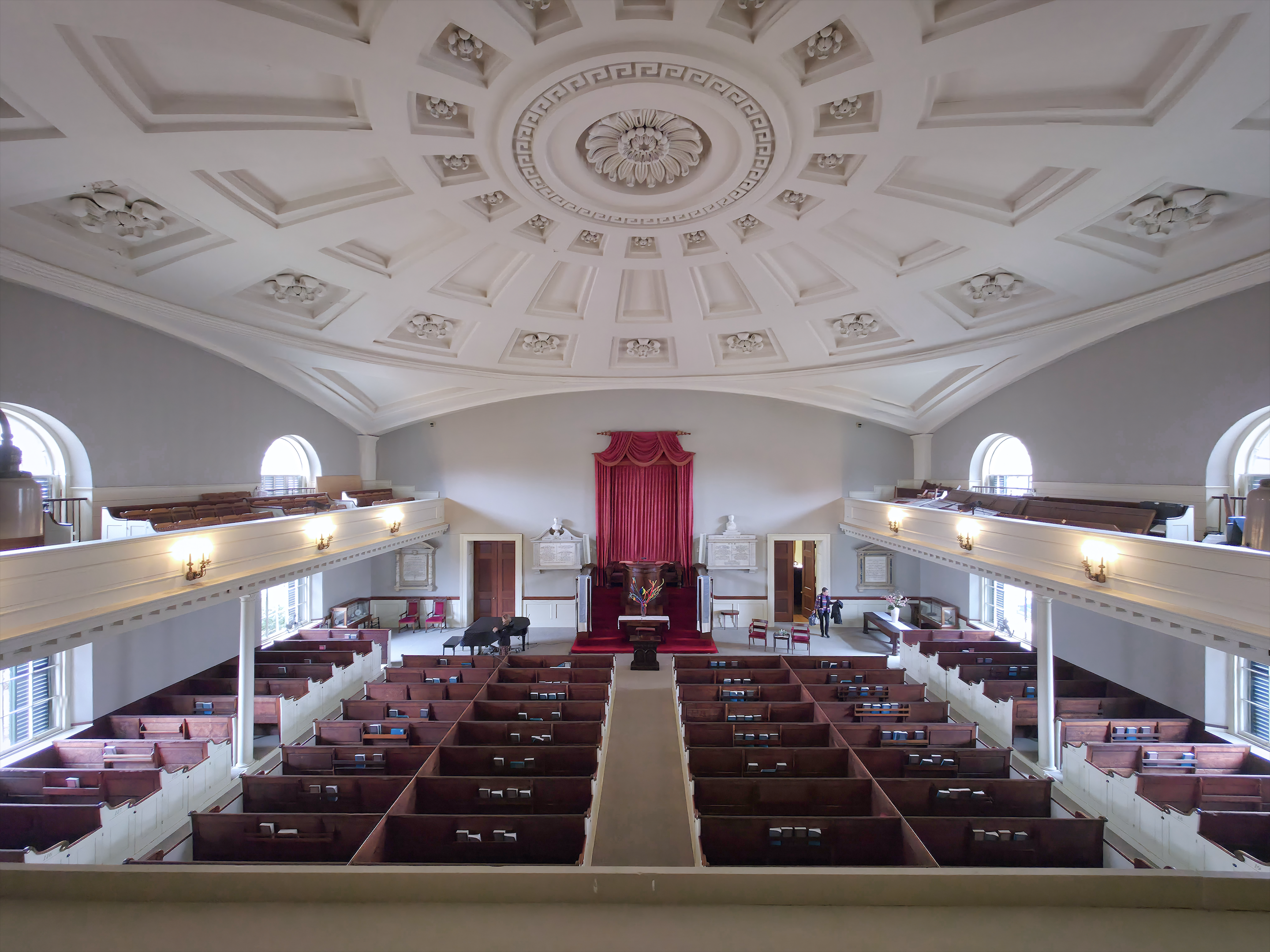
View from gallery

== Gallery ==
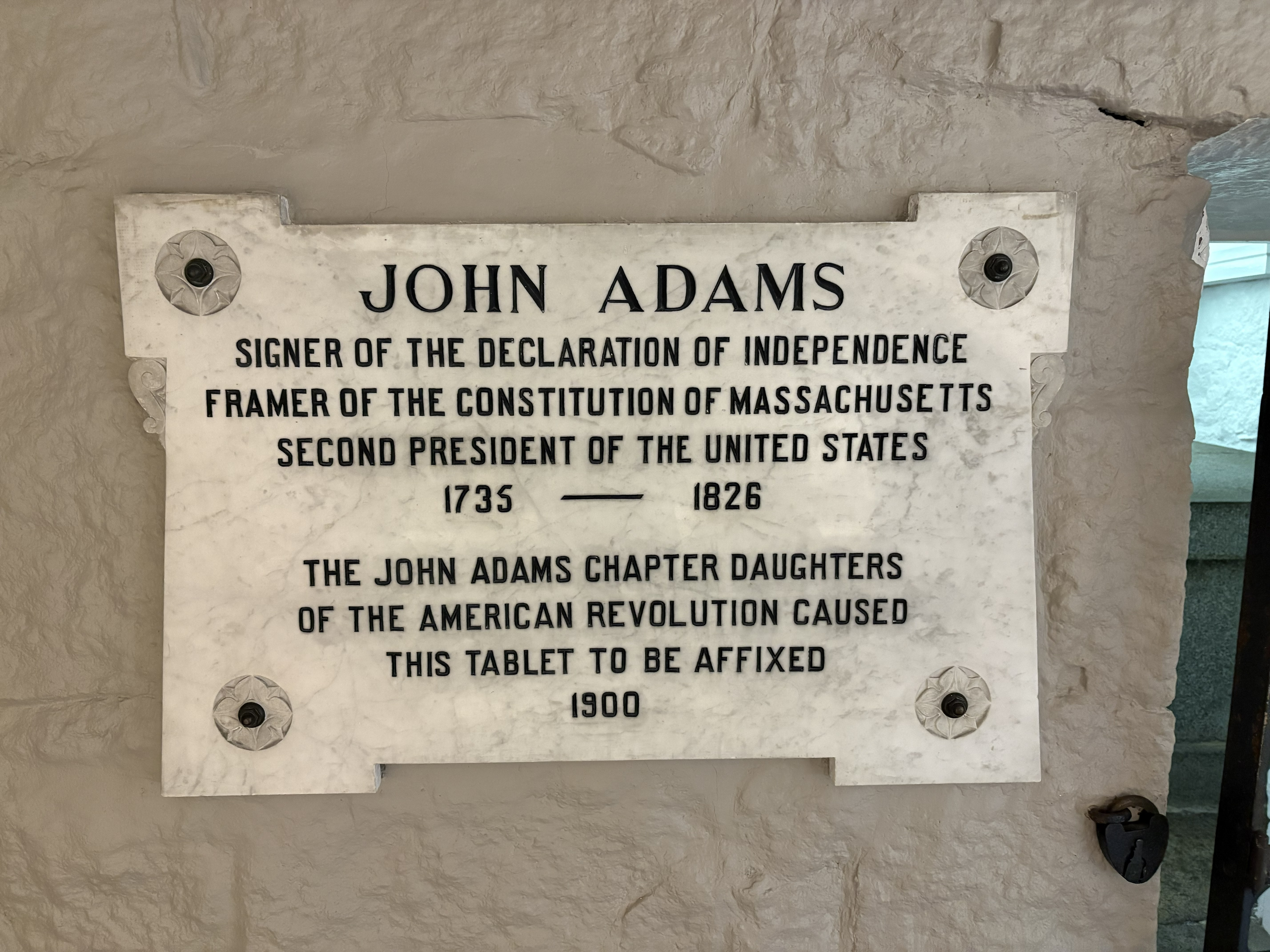
Memorial tablet of John Adams

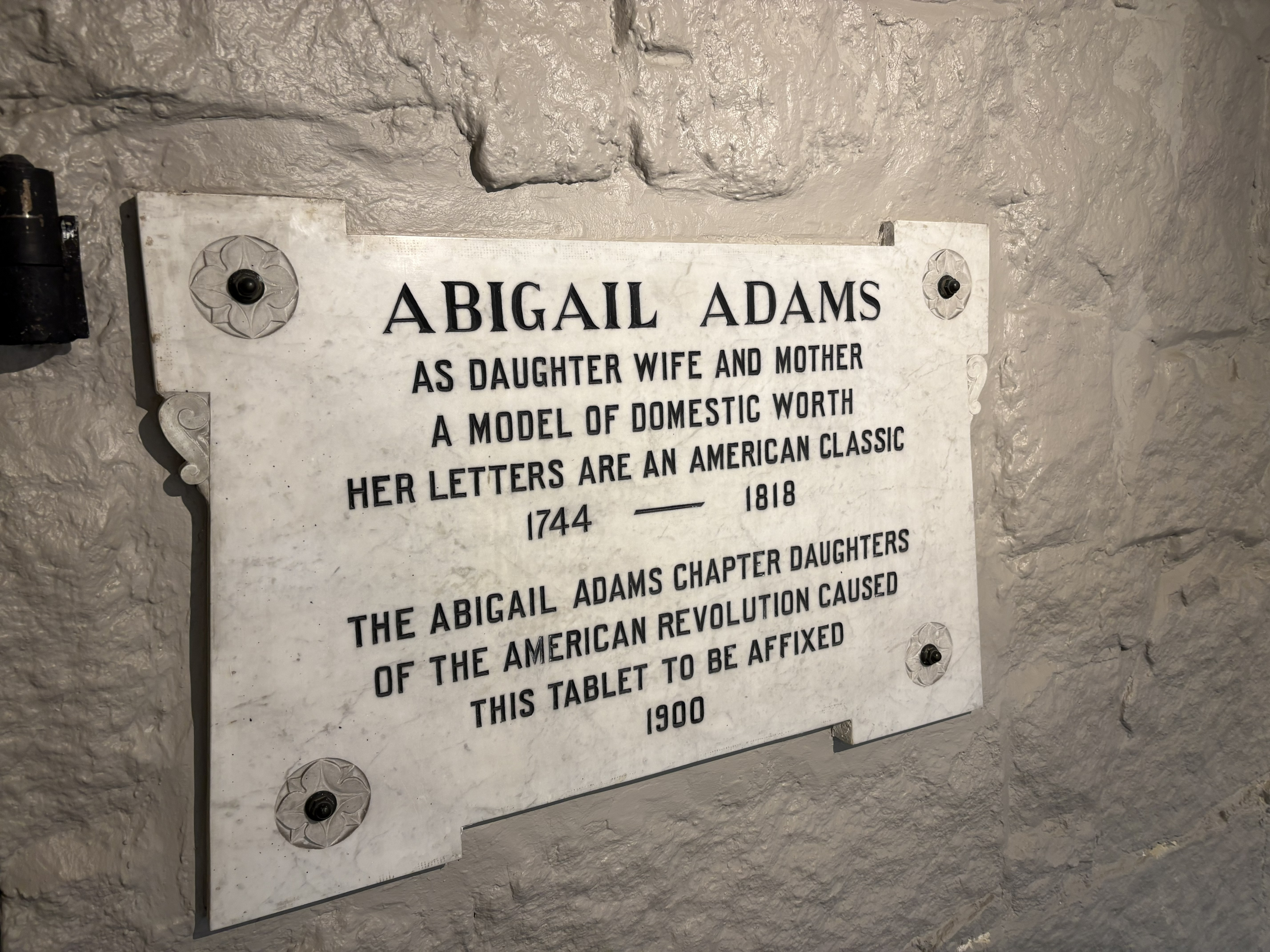
Memorial tablet of Abigail Adams

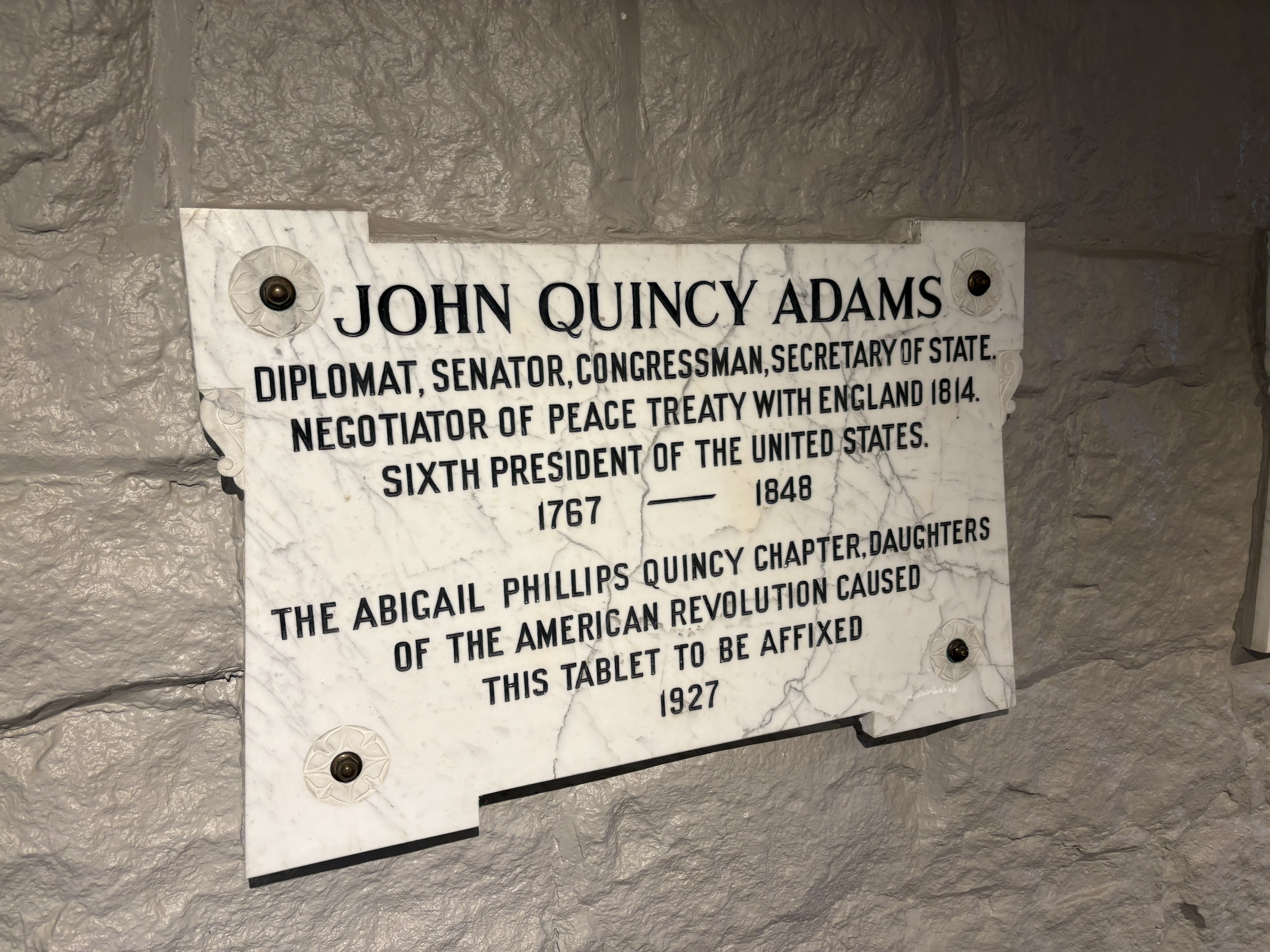
Memorial tablet of John Quincy Adams

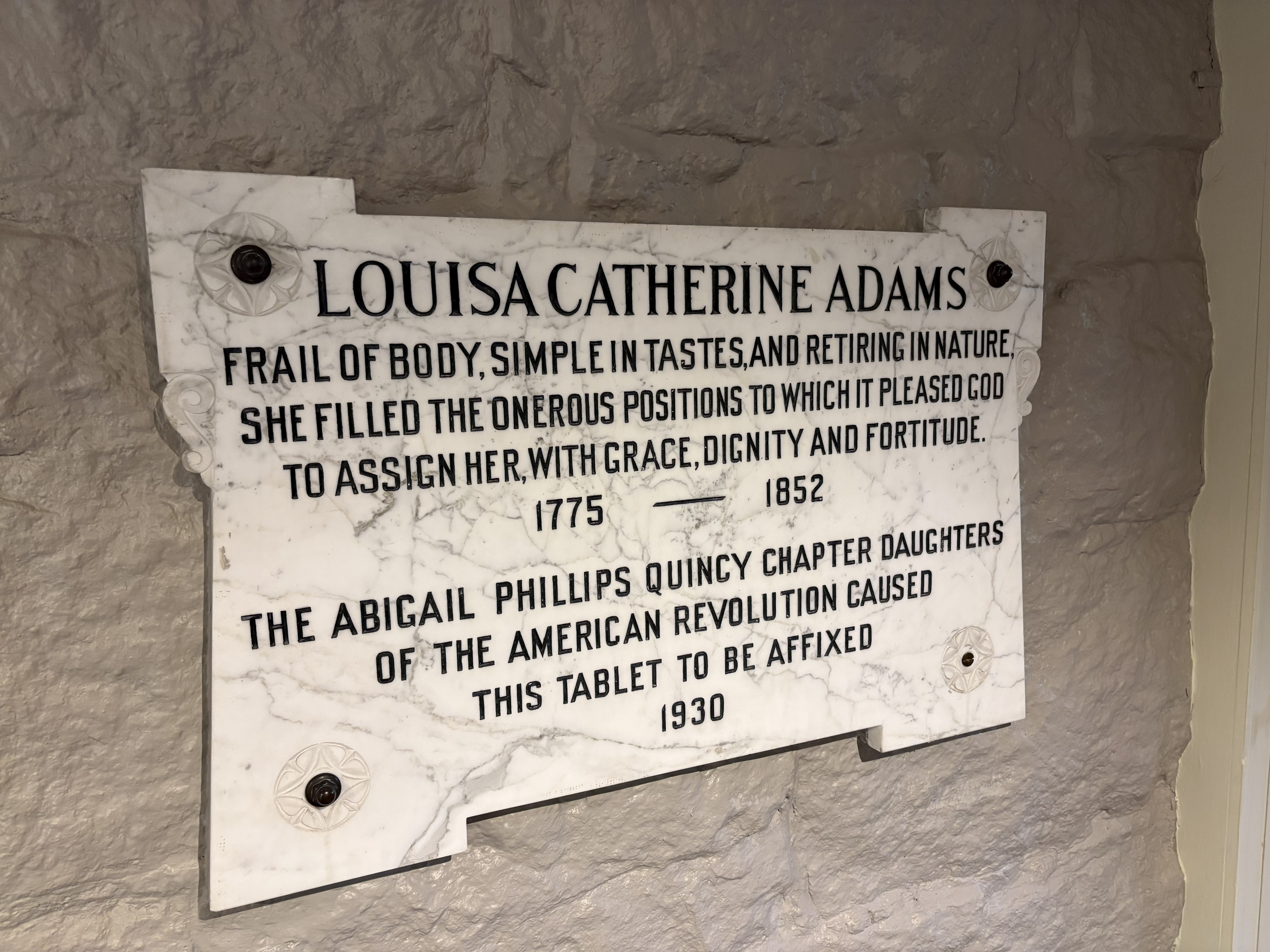
Memorial Tablet of Louisa Adams

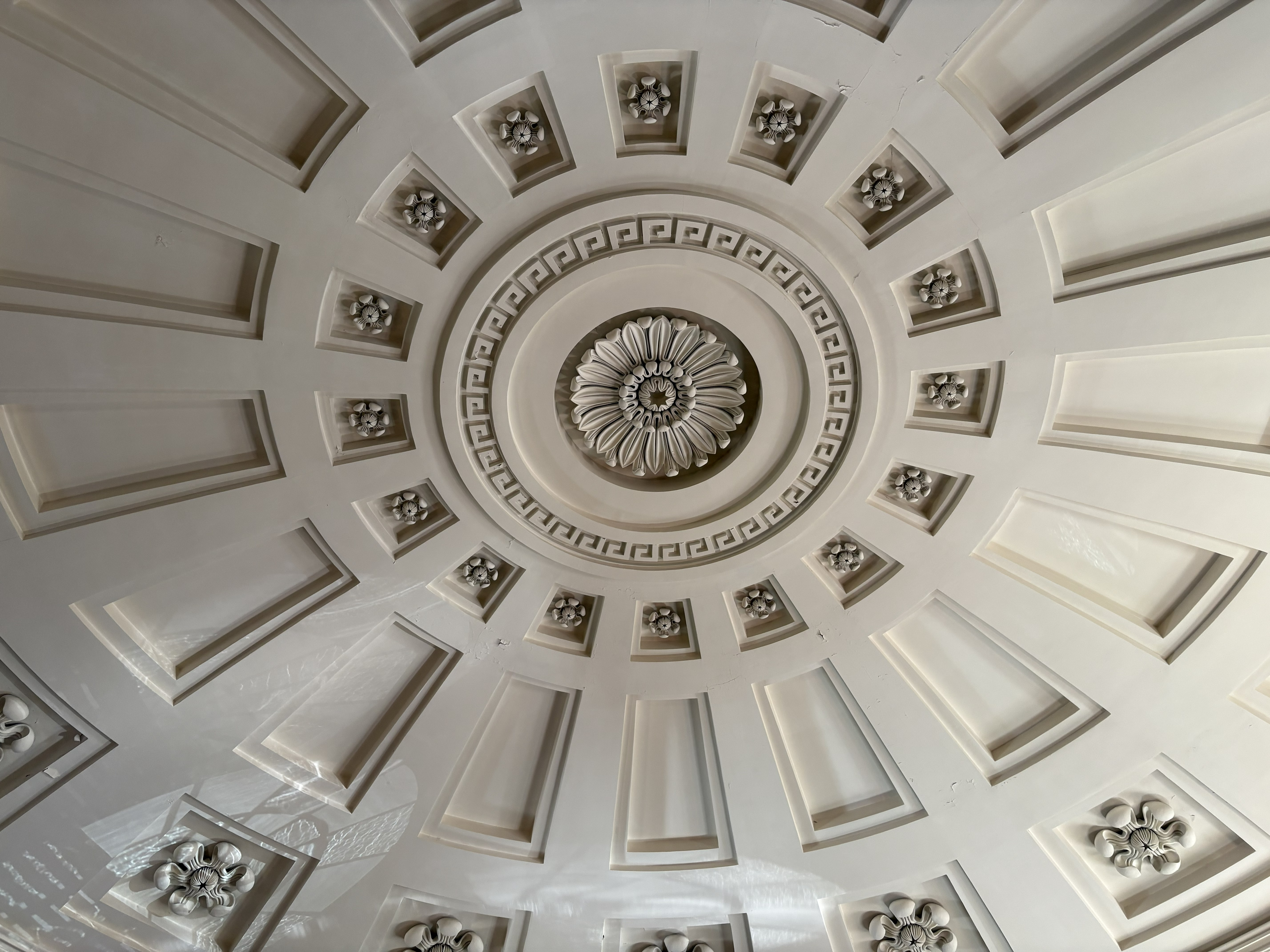
Dome of United First Parish Church

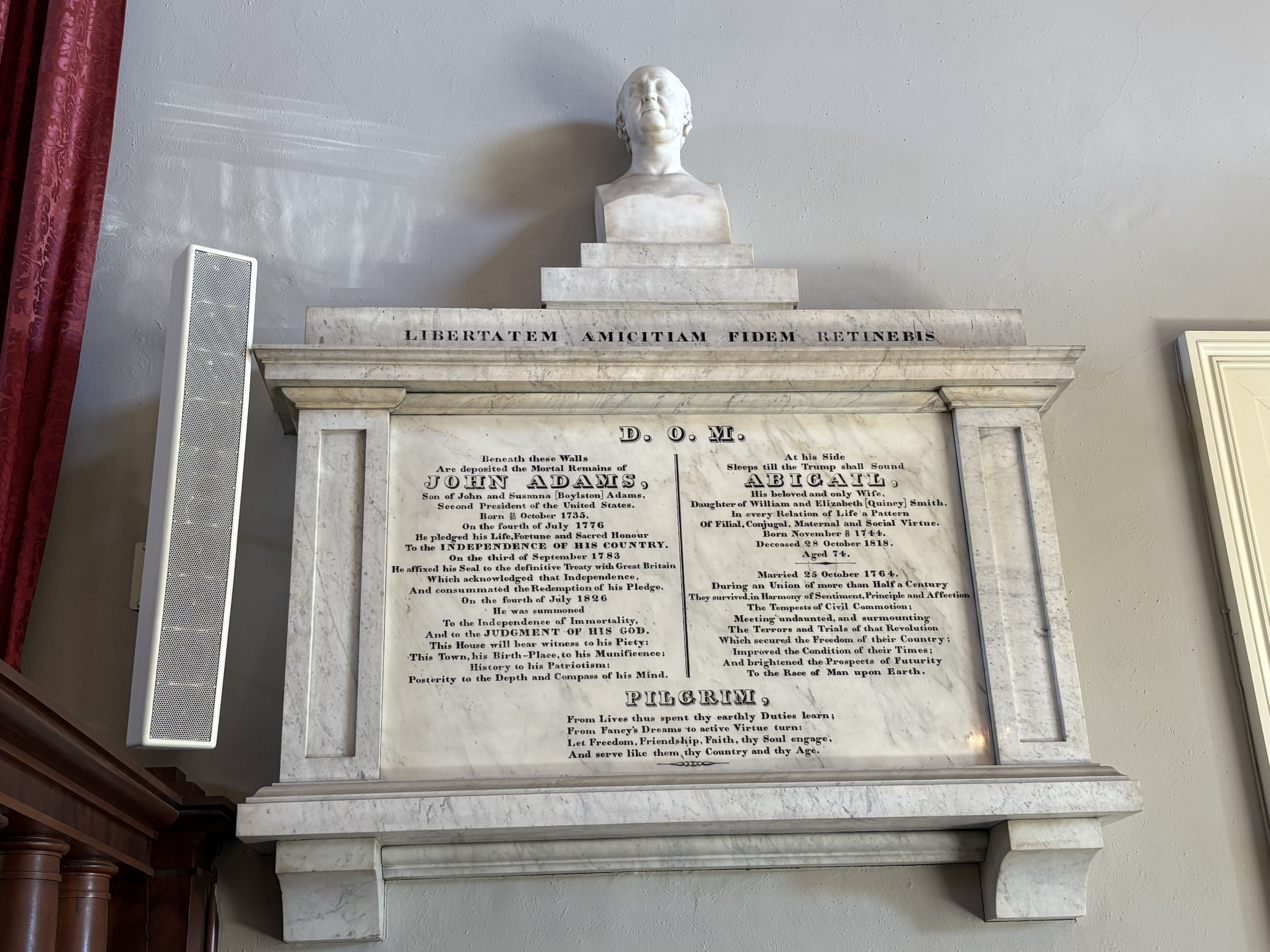
Memorial tablet of John and Abigail Adams

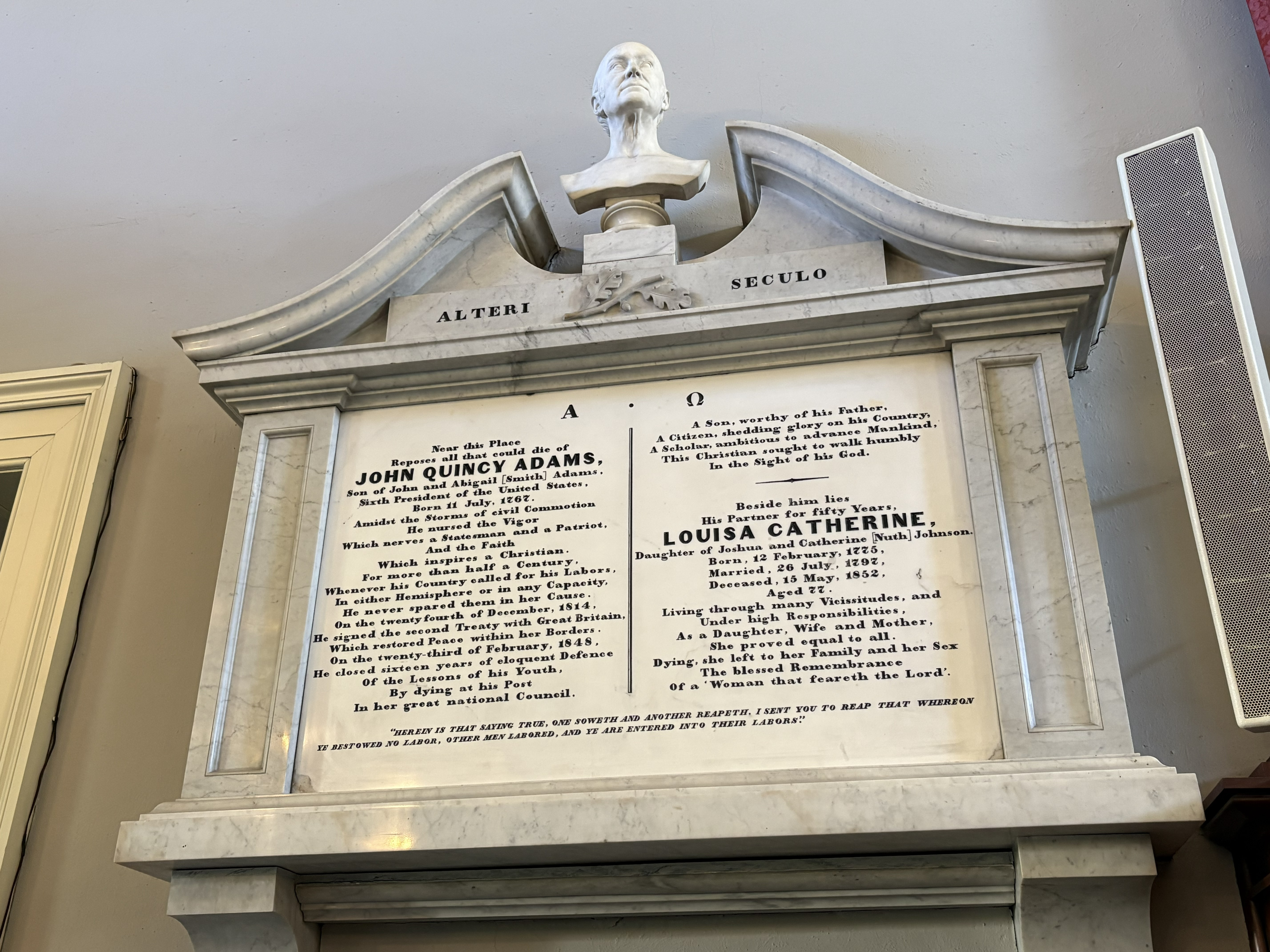
Memorial tablet of John Quincy and Louisa Adams

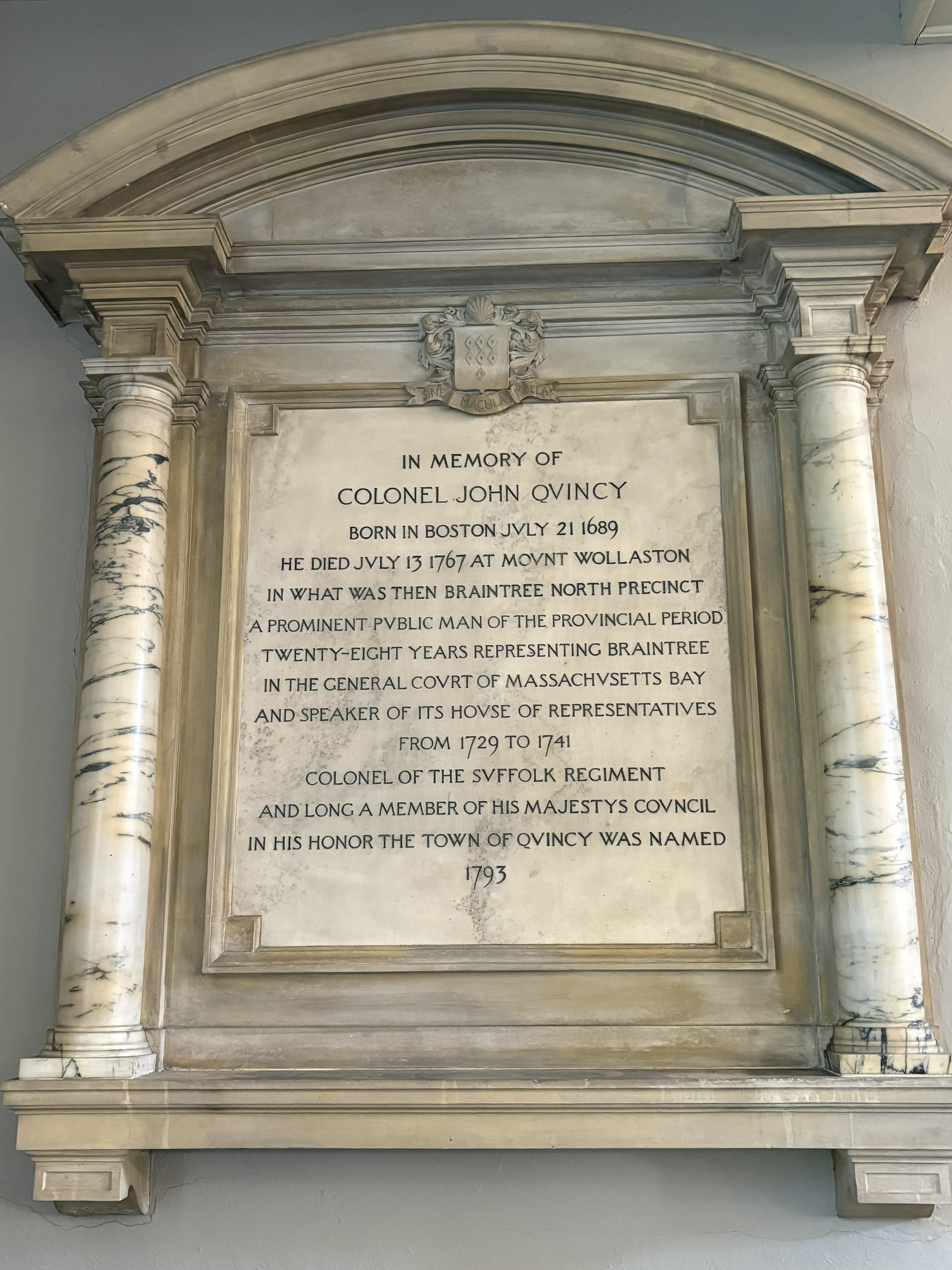
Memorial tablet of John Quincy

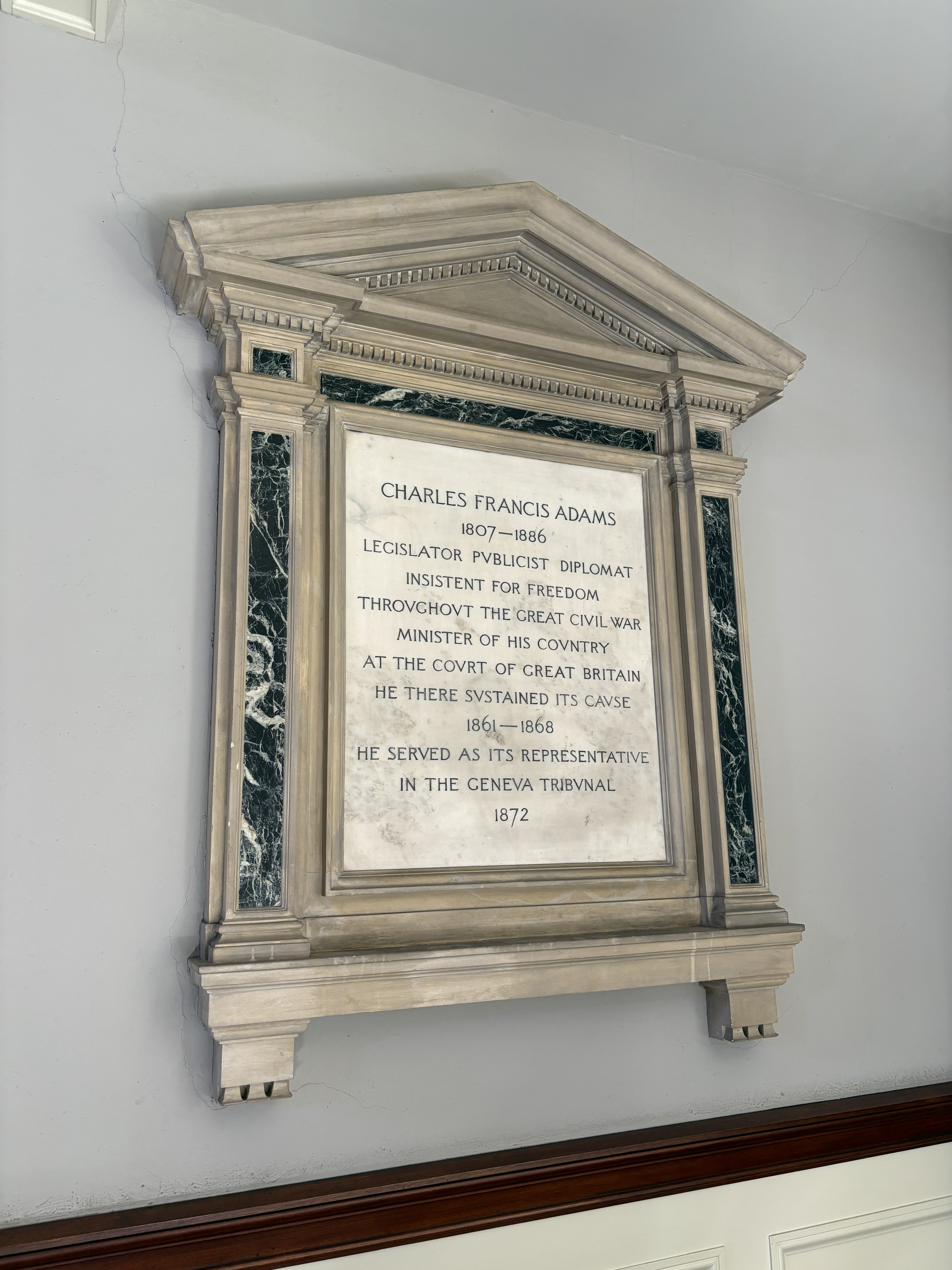
Memorial tablet of Charles Francis Adams

== See also ==
- Church of the Presidents, Long Branch, New Jersey
- Adams National Historical Park
- List of burial places of presidents and vice presidents of the United States
- List of National Historic Landmarks in Massachusetts
- National Register of Historic Places listings in Quincy, Massachusetts
