= E. Thomas =

Fabric mill in Italy

E. Thomas is an Italian fabric mill established in Brusimpiano in 1922 by Ernesto Thomas. The mill's fabrics include a range of blends combining wool with silk, Chinese and Mongolian cashmere, mohair and linen. The mill is located on the Italian shore of Lake Lugano.

== Client companies ==
Club Monaco's head of menswear, Aaron Levine, chose E. Thomas fabric for the brand's Grant suit.

Hickey Freeman uses E. Thomas fabric for some of their garments.

SuitSupply uses E. Thomas fabric for some of their suits and blazers.

== See also ==
- Ermenegildo Zegna
- Loro Piana
- Dormeuil
- Holland & Sherry
- Carlo Barbera
- Lanificio Fratelli Cerruti
- Vitale Barberis Canonico
