= Cerruti (surname) =

Ceruti
Origin
- Origin: Italian
- Meaning: Derived from the Italian word "cero" or "cirro" both of which mean curl
- Region of origin: Italy

Other names
- Variant form: numerous

Cerruti is a surname originating in Italy. It is derived from the Italian word "cero" or "cirro", both of which mean curl.

== Variations ==
Spelling variations of the surname Cerruti include: Cerrati, Cerati, Cerrati, Cerruti, Cherty, Cherti, Ceruti, and many others..

== Notable people ==
- Aimée Cerruti (died 1920), Italian-born American actress
- Carolina Cerruti (born 1962), Venezuelan model
- Federico Cerruti (1922–2015), Italian art collector
- Felice Cerruti Bauduc (1817–1896), Italian painter
- Gabriela Cerruti (born 1965), Argentine journalist, writer, and politician
- Isabel Cerruti (1886–1970), Brazilian anarchist thinker and militant
- Linda Cerruti (born 1993), Italian swimmer
- Marta Cerruti, biomaterials chemist
- Máxima Cerruti (born 1971), Dutch Queen
- Michela Cerruti (born 1987), Italian racing driver
- Michelangelo Cerruti (1663–1748), Italian painter
- Nino Cerruti (1930–2022), Italian fashion designer

== Ceruti ==
- Constanza Ceruti (born 1973), Argentine archaeologist
- Enrico Ceruti (1806–1883), Italian violin maker
- Giacomo Ceruti (1698–1767), Italian Baroque painter
- Giovanni Battista Ceruti (1756–1817), Italian violin maker
- Mauro Ceruti (born 1953), Italian philosopher
- Roberto Ceruti (born 1953), Italian cyclist
- Roque Ceruti (c. 1683–1760), Italian composer

== See also ==
- Cerutti
- Cerruti 1881, a French fashion house
- Cerutti Mastodon site
- Cerati (surname)
