= Reda (fabric mill) =

Italian wool mill

Reda Group is an Italian wool mill established in 1865 by Carlo Reda. The mill is in Valdilana, in the historic Biella region.

== History ==
Lanificio Carlo Reda e figli (Carlo Reda and Sons Woolen Mill) was founded in 1865 in Valle Mosso, in the Province of Biella, by entrepreneur Carlo Reda, who started the company from an old mill. The company was carried forward by his son Giovanni until Luigi Botto took over in 1919.

After the total destruction of its facilities (then known as Successori Reda) in the 1968 floods, the company was reborn. In 1993, the company bought its first farm in New Zealand and currently owns three: Otamatapaio (1993), Rugged Ridges (1997) and Glenrock (2003), for a total of 74,100 acres and 30,000 sheep.

In 2015 in collaboration with The Woolmark Company, Reda celebrated its 150th anniversary with a touring exhibition and a photography book created with Magnum Photos and curated by Angelo Flaccavento.

In April 2018 the company, owned by the fourth generation of the Botto Poala family, bought Comero, a woolen mill based in Gattinara, Vercelli.

Reda's production is divided across three lines: Reda 1865 (classic fabrics), Reda Active for technical sportswear and Reda Flexo, which uses the ROICA™ V550 polymer. It is one of the few textile companies in the world that manages the entire production chain, from breeding farms in New Zealand to finished fabric.

Rewoolution is Reda Group's activewear line. The range's collections are designed for athletes, mountain lovers and outdoor enthusiasts.

In 2020 Reda became the first textile company in Italy and one of the first worldwide to receive the B Corporation certification.

In November 2020 the company fully acquired Lanieri, a digital start-up in which it already was a minority shareholder.

== See also ==
- Ermenegildo Zegna
- Loro Piana
- Dormeuil
- Holland & Sherry
- Carlo Barbera
- Fratelli Piacenza
- Lanificio Fratelli Cerruti
