= Cerruti =

Cerruti may refer to:

- Cerruti 1881, French luxury fashion house
- Lanificio Fratelli Cerruti, wool mill and namesake of the luxury fashion house
- Cerruti (surname), Italian surname
