= History of Italian fashion =

The history of Italian fashion is a chronological record of the events and people that impacted and evolved Italian fashion into what it is today. From the Middle Ages, Italian fashion has been popular internationally, with cities in Italy producing textiles like velvet, silk, and wool. During the Middle Ages and Renaissance, Italian fashion for both men and women was extravagant and expensive, but the fashion industry declined during the industrialization of Italy. Many modern Italian fashion brands were founded in the late 19th and early 20th centuries, and in the 1950s and 1960s, Italian fashion regained popularity worldwide. While many clients of Italian fashion designers are celebrities, Italian fashion brands also focus on ready-to-wear clothes.

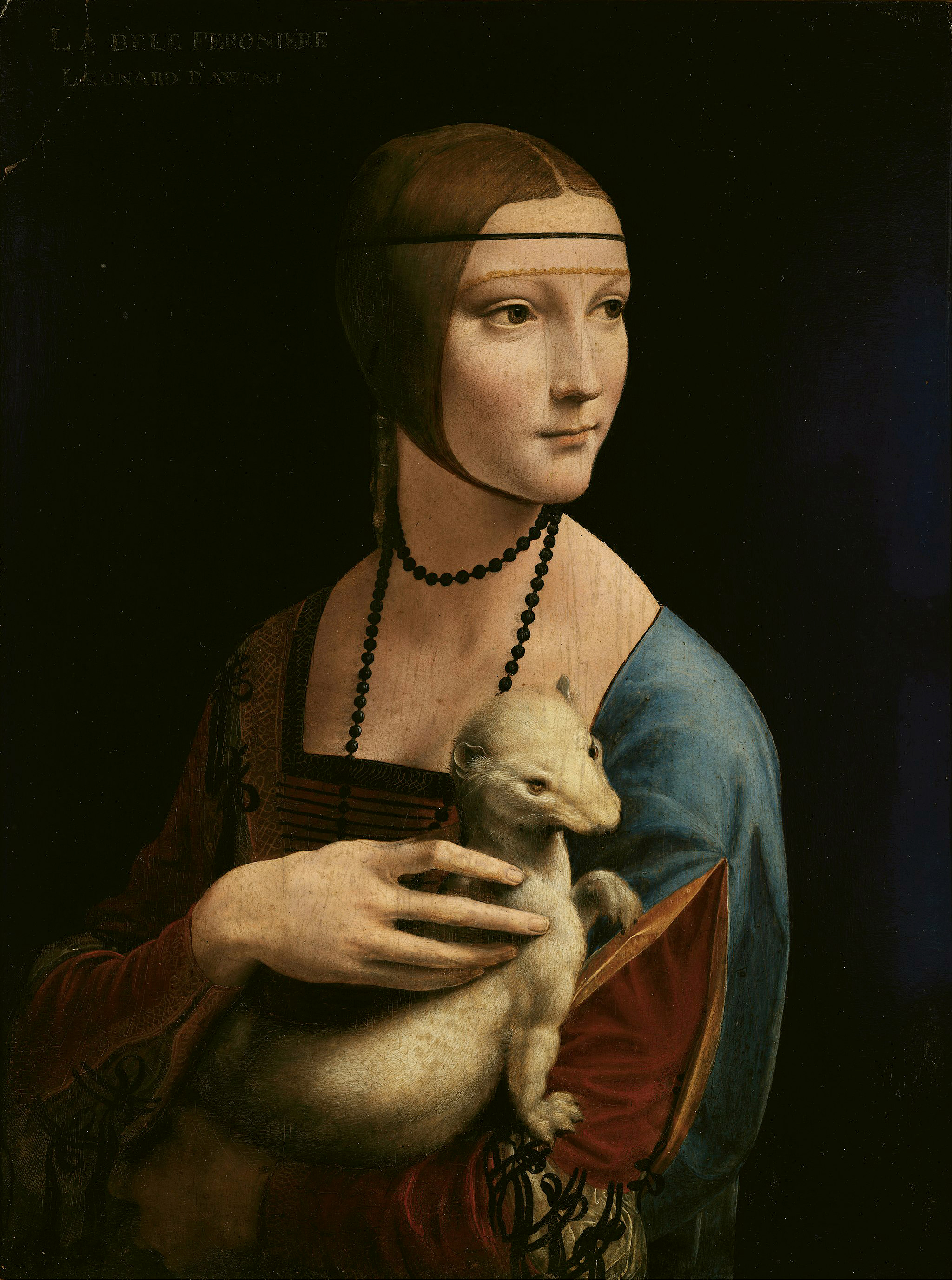
Cecilia Gallerani as The Lady with an Ermine, painted by Leonardo da Vinci around 1489. This painting exemplifies Italian fashion in the 15th century.

== Renaissance ==
Italian fashion, art, music, and philosophy flourished during the Renaissance in Italy. The cities of Venice, Milan, Florence, Palermo, Naples, and Rome produced textiles such as velvet, silk, and wool. Italian fashion grew in popularity and influence across Europe, and was preferred by one of the most powerful families in Italy, the Medicis of Florence. In the 15th and 16th centuries, Italian fashion was influenced by the art of Michelangelo, Leonardo da Vinci, and Raphael. Italian fashion was extravagant and expensive, crafted from velvet, brocade, ribbons, and jewels.

=== Women's styles during the Renaissance ===
In the 1400s, women's fashion shifted from high-necked gowns and braided hair wrapped around the head to layered V-shaped necklines and longer braids. Gathered and pleated skirts were popular. Women's fashion at the time could be defined by one word: fullness. While men worked to accentuate the top portion of their bodies, women did the opposite. The top and bust area was always fitted and the waist was to be accentuated as the tiniest part of the body. Then the bottom half of the body would be made to look as full as possible, with extravagant and over the top skirts. Wide and puffed sleeves were the popular styles and wealthy women often had fur lined sleeves. Clothing was not about comfort or convenience, as women would typically wear about 5 layers on an everyday basis. Women's dresses consisted of fitted garments worn underneath a belted dress, also called giornea. Unlike the men's, the women's giornea covered their feet, and originally evolved from the houppelande (a long, full-skirted gown with a high collar). The skirts were fitted around the waist and often pleated. Earlier dresses had a slit in the front that revealed the garment underneath, and later dresses had a slit on the side. Underneath the giornea, women wore a gamurra, a long dress that had a high waistline. Some had detachable sleeves. The undergarment was a plain linen dress, called a camicia. Women wore high heels called Pianelle. Heels were worn less for fashion at the time and more for functionality. Women wore heeled shoes to keep their dresses from dragging on the damp and dirty streets.

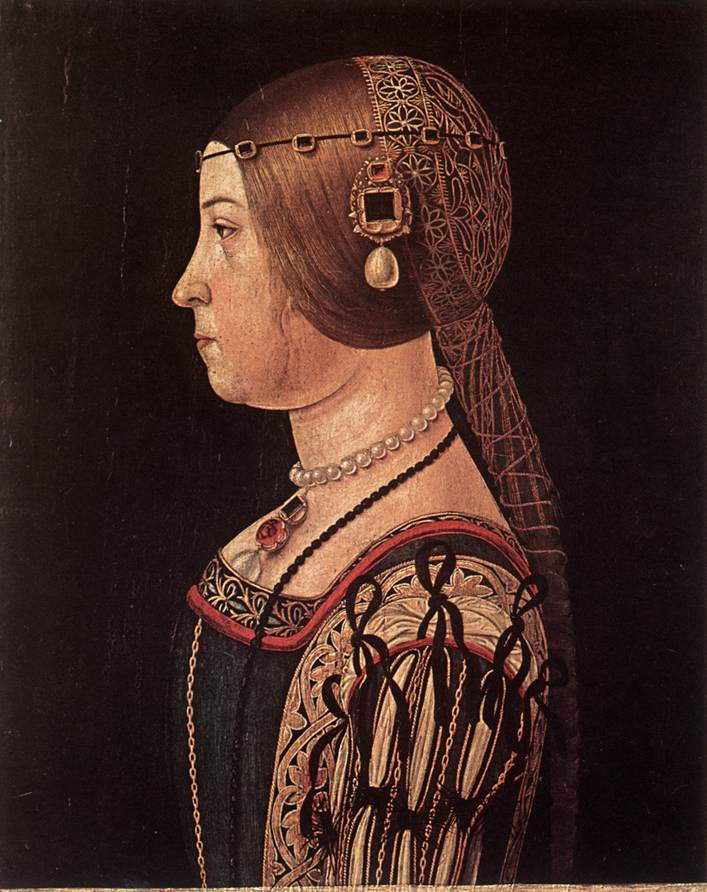
Portrait of Barbara Pallavicino by Alessandro Araldi, ca. 1510

=== Women's hairstyles and headdresses ===
Hairstyles at the time were dependent on a woman's marital status. If a woman was single, she would wear her hair down, usually in loose curls. Once women were wed, they would begin wearing their hair up, in tight braids. Popular accessories for the hair:

- Lenza- a leather cord known as a worn around the head to keep hair flat
- Trinzale- a sheer hairnet worn at the back of the head and sometimes beaded
- Coazzoni -women parted their hair in the middle and smoothed to the head with a long braid at the back, where ribbons or netting could be added.
- Wigs and False Braids
- Other hairstyles used long strips of ribbon to secure the hair and tie it into a bun.

=== Men's styles during the Renaissance ===
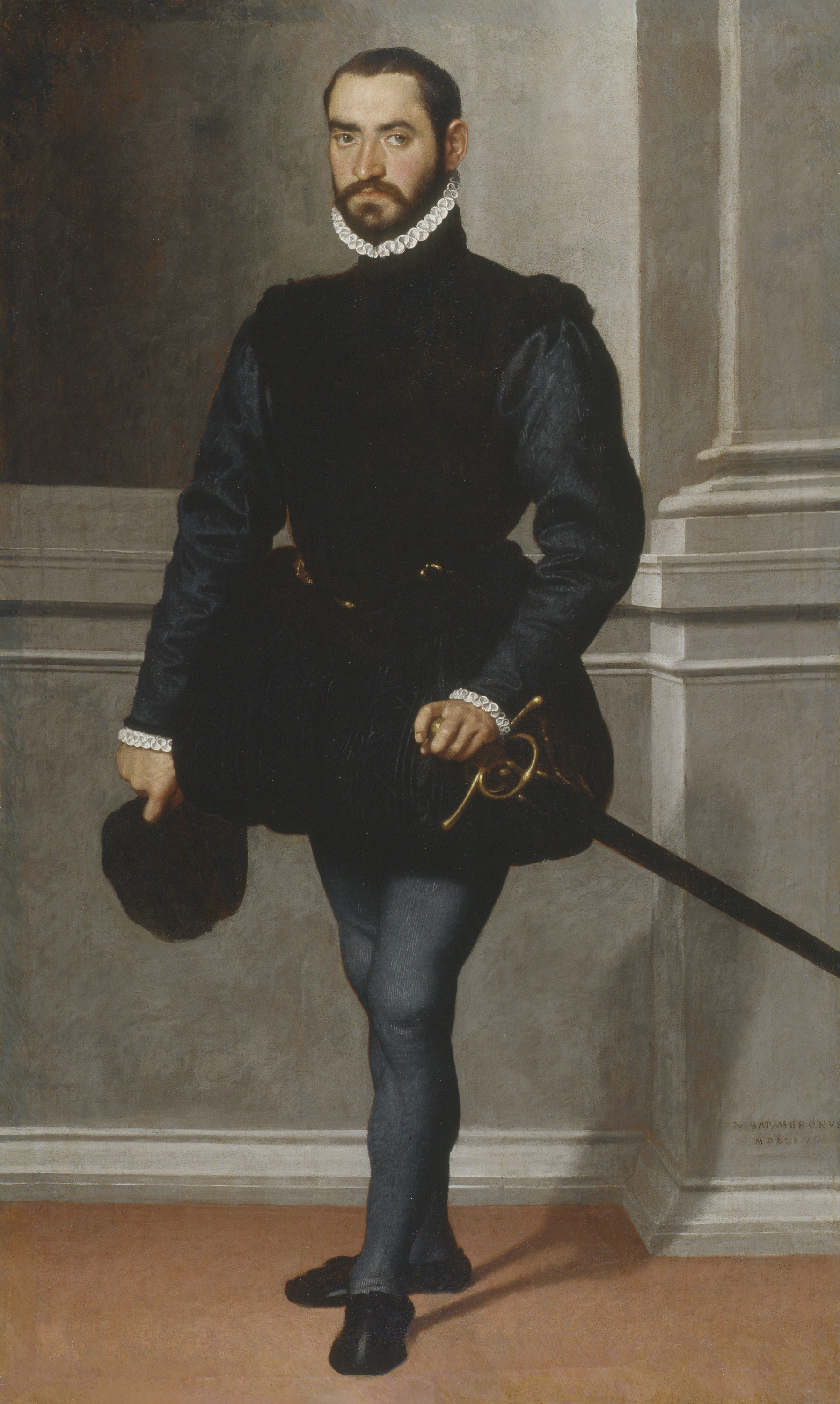
Giovanni Battista Moroni - Bearded Man in Black, 1576. Renaissance men wore hose or tights to emphasize their lower body.

During the Italian Renaissance, men wore large, fitted waistcoats underneath pleated overcoats called giornea, which had wide, puffy mutton sleeves and were often made from brocade. Men wore hats like caps and berets. Men typically wore an overcoat called a cioppa, which had lining of a different color than the main fabric, a defining feature of fashion during the Italian Renaissance. Men typically wore hose or tights that emphasized their lower bodies. Men and women wore outer clothes with detachable and often slashed sleeves of varied designs. Wealthy people owned many different pairs of sleeves to match their overcoats and dresses. The Renaissance changed societal attitudes toward clothing and appearance. Men in particular wanted to wear more fitted clothes to emphasize their body shape. Merchants expanded the market for apparel, and created complementary accessories such as hats, hairnets, bags, and gloves. The widespread use of mirrors, popular in Renaissance interior design and architecture, increased interest in self-image and fashion.

=== Men's hairstyles and headdresses ===
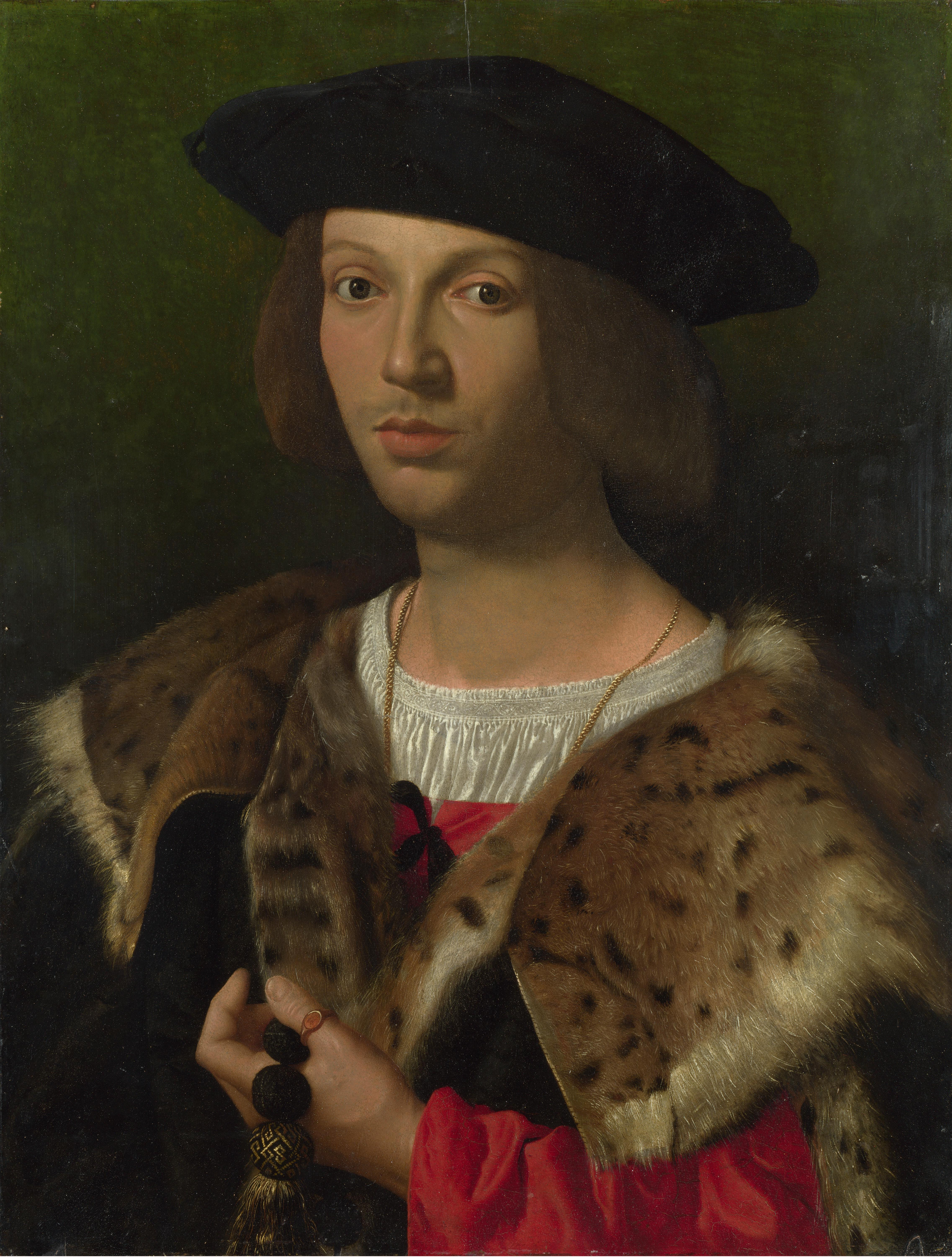
Portrait of a fashionable young man wearing a cap. (1518)

The bonnet was worn by Venetians. The bonnet is a small, round or squared, brimless cap that was usually red or black and made of felt or velvet. It is unadorned and sometimes pinched in at the four corners. Slight variations in the bonnet's style were visible among the different social classes and professions. For church officials and university professors, the cap had four corners or the sign of the cross. For a doctor of divinity, the cap had three corners. The cornered cap evolved into today's square trencher or mortarboard university hat.

- Flat cap or beret (Popular during the first half of the 16th century).

It was often worn over a velvet coif or gold cord net and sometimes attached to a wig. Caps for daily use were made out of cloth, while fancier bonnets were made out of luxurious materials like felt, velvet, satin, taffeta, scarceness (a thin silk) and straw in the summer. The decorations used for the beret were usually white, in untrimmed ostrich, peacock, marabou and wool imitation, and plumes. Feathers held with jeweled sockets with spangles and jewels would often be sewn onto the spine. Brooches with sacred motifs were also used for decoration. Small gold ornaments in bowknots, rings, and buttons were sewn to the underside of the brim.

It was common for men in the 16th century to have a clean-shaven face along with a straight or crimped bob. Long bangs of natural hair or silk wigs were fashionable, as well. Francois I started the trend of short hair and beards in the Italians and the Swiss, after accidentally cutting his hair. In the 1560s, starch was invented and men started to starch their beards. From the 1570s to 1590s, men brushed the front of their hair up off their foreheads. For elegant events or occasions, men wore wigs to conceal their baldness. They would wear tilted berets attached to a wig instead of a coif. Wigs were made out of real hair.

=== Clerical dress ===
Prior to 1500, there were no rules about the color of the clerical dress. However, due to a decision in 1565 in Milan, black became the accepted color in Italy. While white remained as the pope's biretta color, scarlet was accepted by the Cardinals, purple by the bishops, and black by the clerics.

== Decline ==
In the 17th century, Italian fashion fell into a decline, while Spain, England, and France led the industry. In Europe, French fashion was most popular. The fashion industry remained active in Italy, especially in Rome, Milan, and Florence. In the mid-19th century, cheaper silk was imported to Milan from Asia because the phylloxera pest infestation damaged silk and wine produced in Italy. After industrialization, metal, mechanical, and furniture manufacturing replaced textile production. Some of the first modern Italian fashion designers, such as Bulgari, Prada, Gucci, and Ferragamo, were founded in the late 19th and early 20th centuries. In the 1950s and 1960s, Italian fashion regained popularity worldwide.

During this time, the production of fabrics growth up, allowing fashion designers to have access to high-quality fabrics a century later. Three major production centers in the wool industry started to develop in Italy: Veneto, Piedmont, and Tuscany. In Veneto, industrialist Alessandro Rossi set up wool factories in Schio, leading the company of his father Francesco Rossi. La Fabbrica Alta was the most notable one. Meanwhile, Gaetano Marzotto specialized in fine carded and combed fabric in Valdagno. In the Biella area of Piedmont surged some of the most recognized fabric manufacturers, such as Piacenza, Reda, Rivetti, Zegna, Sella, and Loro Piana. In this region appeared the first wool association in Italy.

In 1911, Lombardy concentrated the spindles and looms of Italy. Half of them were in the region. Families such as Cantoni, Ponti, and Crespi became influential in the industry. In 1922, cotton fabrics reached 100 000 tones. It increased to 145 000 tonnes in 1940.

== Revival ==
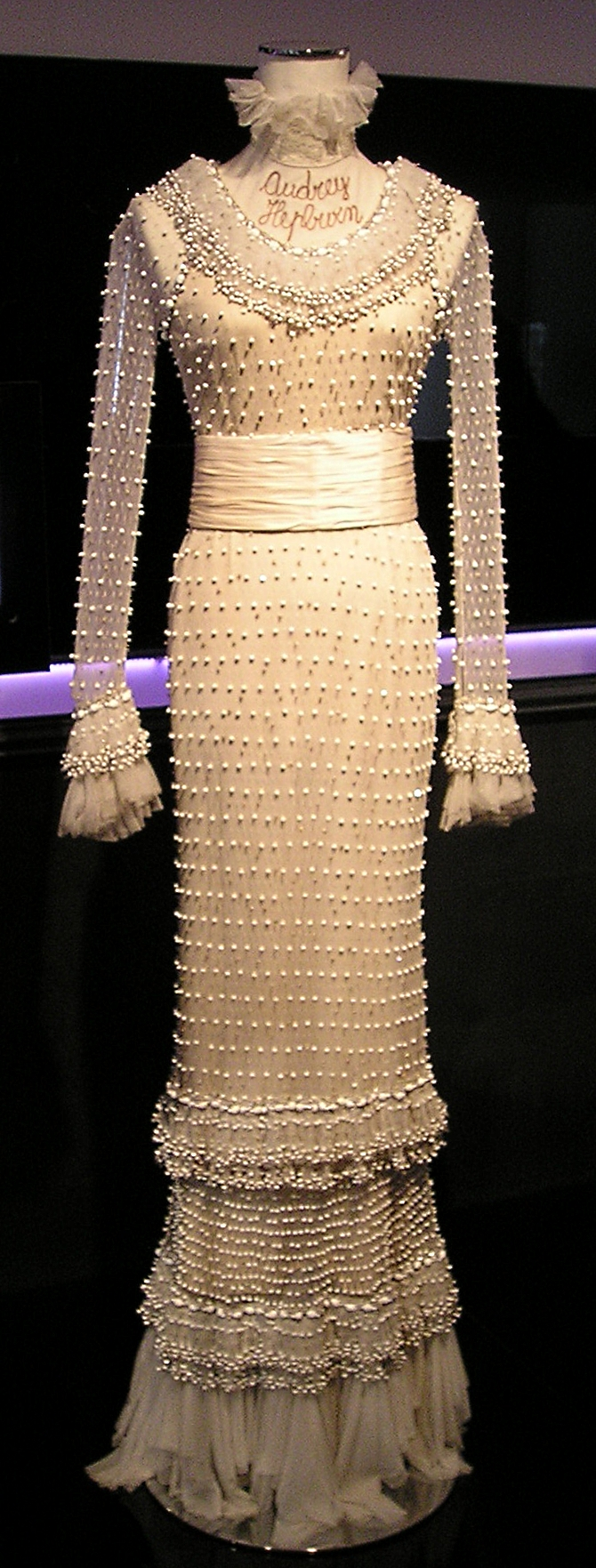
A dress made by Valentino for Audrey Hepburn.

In the post-war, Italian handmade items were recognized as high quality and low-cost products. Italy adopted American methods of production and took advantage of preexisting connections between Italian tailors that emigrated to the United States. The United States helped to Italian textile and clothing industry to integrate into the world, creating also a demand for Italian products.

In Florence, Giovanni Battista Giorgini achieved the first contact between Italian fashion and American buyers. He convinced Italian designers to show their works to fashion journalists and American buyers. On 12 February 1951, the Italian businessman Giovanni Battista Giorgini held a fashion show in Florence to make Italy an international leader in fashion design. In 1952, Brioni staged the first men's fashion show in history. Prior to his soirées in 1951 to 1953, Italy had begun exporting luxury fashion goods and handbags to other nations, including the United States.

The growing presence of Italy in the American market allowed an expansion of the Italian fashion industry. Exports grew by more than 150 percent from 1950 to 1956. In 1957, Italy was the main European exporter to the United States and Canada. Unlike other countries leading the fashion industry, Italian lacked a center associated with a national style. Florence, Rome, and Milan disputed the title. Each urban center displayed an own tradition in craftsmanship.

In 1957, textile products were the second largest retail sale group in Italy after food. There were 175 000 shops specialized in selling linen, knitwear, socks, fabrics, ready-made clothes, shoes, jewelers and custom jewelers, milliners, furriers, and luggage. Ready-to-Wear industry existed in Italy for a long time, but its boom surged between 1958 and 1963, during the economic miracle.

In the 1960s, the handbags produced by the designer Gucci drew the attention of celebrities such as Grace Kelly, Peter Sellers, Audrey Hepburn and the First Lady of the United States, Jackie Kennedy. Gucci's "GG" monogram logo became synonymous with Hollywood fashion. Jackie Kennedy developed a close friendship with the Italian designer Valentino Garavani, and wore his designs ever since 1965, including at her wedding to Aristotle Onassis. Florence was Italy's fashion capital in the 1950s and 1960s, and Milan in the 1970s and 1980s, with Versace, Armani, and Dolce & Gabbana opening up their first boutiques there. Until the 1970s, Italian fashion primarily served the wealthy, similar to haute couture in France.

In the 1970s and 1980s, Italian fashion started to concentrate on ready-to-wear clothes, such as jeans, sweaters, and miniskirts. Milan had more affordable styles for shoppers, and Florence was no longer considered the fashion capital of Italy. New clothing labels, such as Miu Miu and Geox, started to appear worldwide in the 1990s. Many celebrities, such as Beyoncé, Axl Rose, Elton John, Naomi Campbell, Elizabeth Hurley, Lady Gaga, Victoria Beckham, Madonna, Britney Spears, Rihanna, Alexandra Burke, Christina Aguilera, and even Diana, Princess of Wales, were clients of Italian fashion designers.

Milan and Rome are important internationally in the fashion industry, along with Tokyo, Los Angeles, London, Paris and New York. Venice, Florence, Naples, Bologna, Genoa, and Turin are other important centers of fashion. Italy's main shopping districts are the Via Montenapoleone fashion district in Milan, the Galleria Vittorio Emanuele in Milan, Via dei Condotti in Rome, Via de' Tornabuoni in Florence, and Chiaia in Naples.
