= Suitsupply =

Dutch men's fashion brand

Suitsupply B.V.
- Industry: Fashion/apparel
- Founded: 2000; 26 years ago in Amsterdam, Netherlands
- Founder: Fokke de Jong
- Headquarters: Amsterdam, Netherlands
- Number of locations: 150 (2023)
- Area served: Worldwide
- Products: Menswear
- Website: suitsupply.com

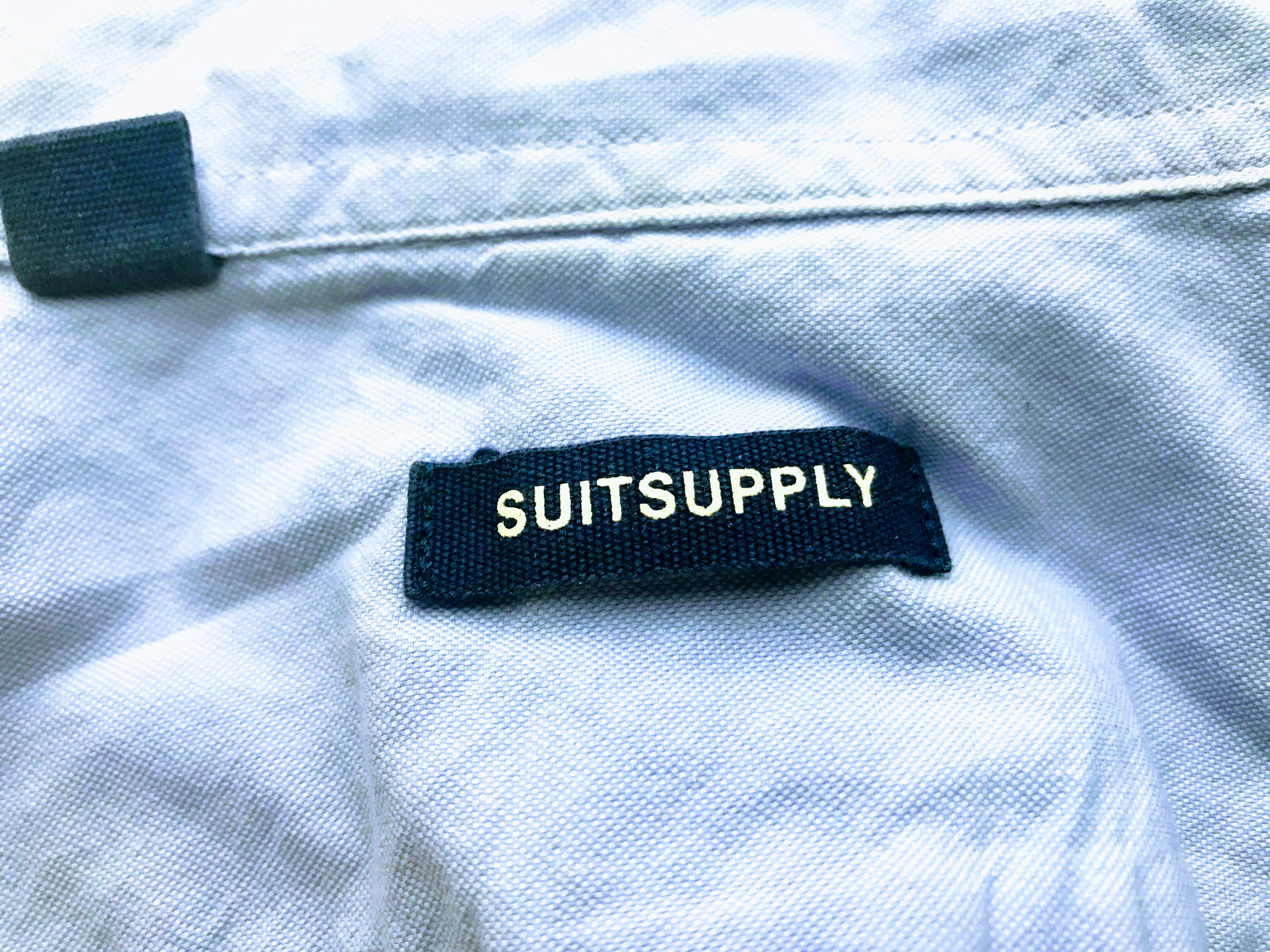
A brand label on the inside of a Suitsupply dress shirt

Suitsupply is a Dutch men's suit and fashion brand founded in 2000 by Fokke de Jong in Amsterdam.

Suitsupply is a vertically integrated company. It is a member of the Fair Wear Foundation (FWF) and uses fabrics sourced from Italian mills including Vitale Barberis Canonico and Reda. Its suits are made in China.

== History ==
Fokke de Jong, the current CEO of the privately held company, ran the company from his dorm room at the University of Amsterdam in 2000. Suitsupply's first store outside the Netherlands opened in Antwerp in 2007, and in the same year, a store was opened on Vigo Street, London.

Suitsupply's headquarters are located in Amsterdam; they also have offices in New York City, Dallas, and Shanghai. Suitsupply has an online store and brick-and-mortar stores in countries across Europe, Asia, and the Americas.

Suitsupply was named among the best new menswear stores by GQ Magazine in 2011.

In 2020, the turnover decreased by 39% to 205 million euros (compared to 336 million euros in 2019) and incurred a loss of 109.7 million euros (compared to 1.8 million euros loss in 2019).

Fashion industry writer Tim Gunn named Suitsupply's "impeccable and affordable" suits on a list of '12 things he can't live without' in an interview for Elle Decor.

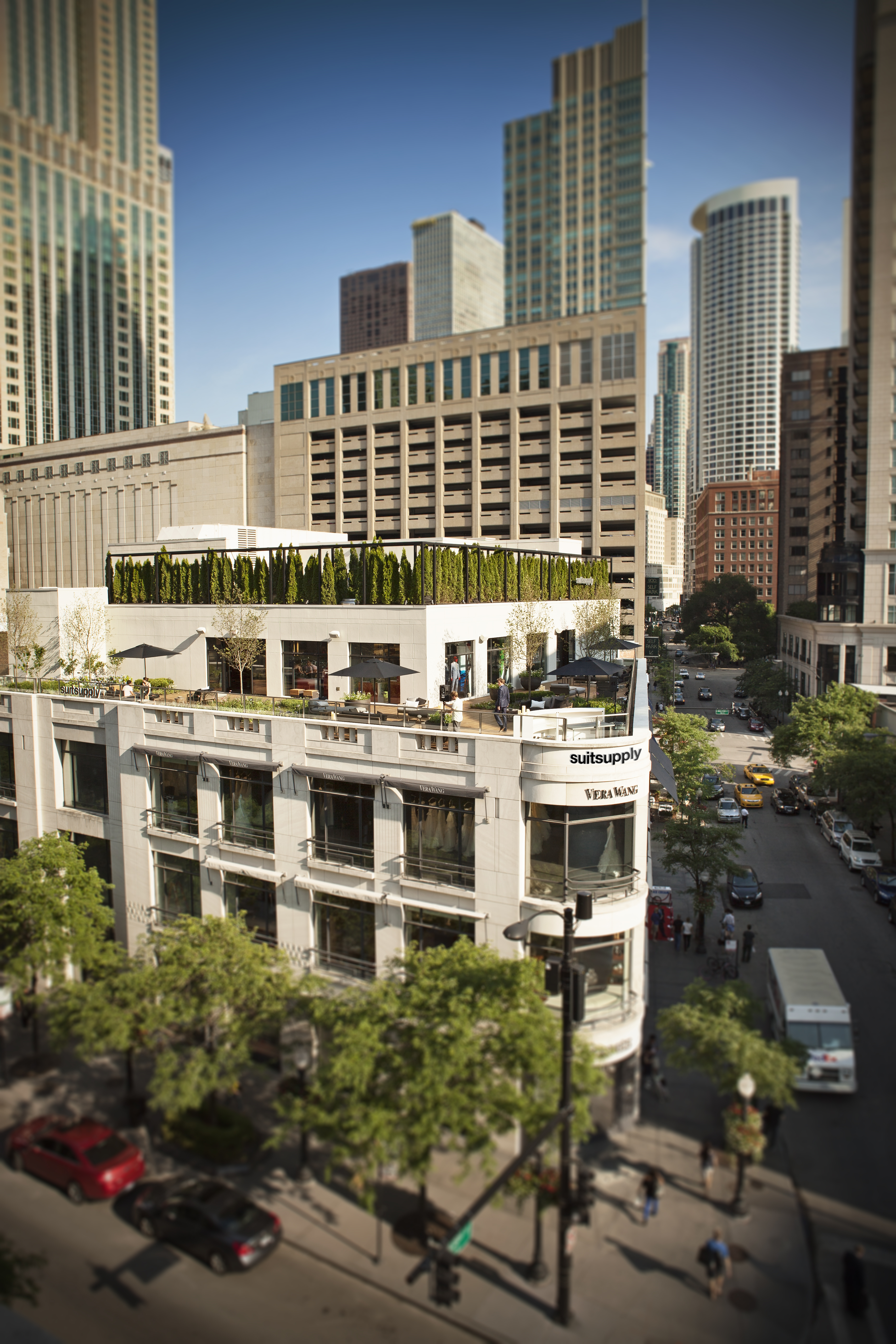
Suitsupply Chicago Store on Rush Street

== Marketing campaigns ==
Suitsupply is known for its sexually charged photography and advertisements, created in partnership with Carli Hermes.

Select images from the "Shameless" campaign were withdrawn from a London store due to their visibility to children, which elicited criticism, especially from the Westfield London location.

According to a ruling by the Belgian advertising standards authority, several photos from the Shameless campaign had to be removed from Suitsupply's website and Facebook page for portraying the female model as a sex object or as submissive to the male model.

The spring/summer 2016 campaign, titled Toy Boys, depicted doll-size men in suits playing on giant female bodies; scenes included: men sliding down a model's bare chest, straddling a woman's neck, standing on a woman and spraying a hose into her mouth, etc. The images provoked controversy on social media.

== Collaborations ==
Suitsupply was official supplier of the Dutch Olympic team, dressing athletes for Beijing 2008, Vancouver 2010, London 2012, and Rio 2016.

Suitsupply collaborated with Antonio Maurizi, an Italian shoemaker, for a capsule collection of six shoes in 2012.
