= Luciano Barbera =

High-end men's clothing company

- Type: Privately held
- Industry: Manufacturing
- Founded: 1970; 56 years ago
- Founder: Carlo Barbera
- Successor: Luciano Barbera
- Headquarters: Biella, Italy
- Products: Men's Clothing
- Owner: Luciano Barbera
- Website: https://www.lucianobarbera.com

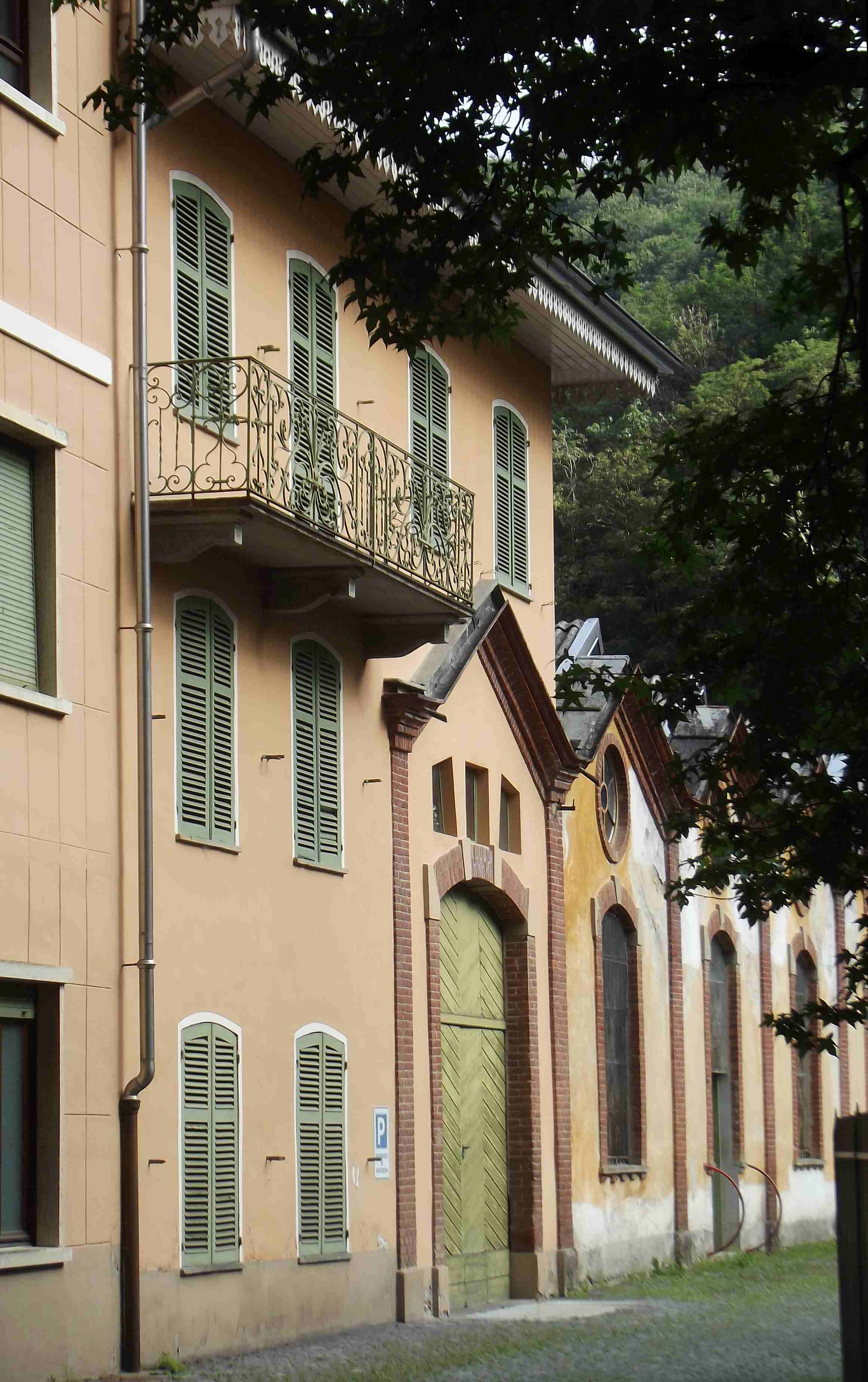
The oldest part of Callabiana factory.

Luciano Barbera is a high-end men’s clothing company based in Biella, Italy, a town and commune in the northern Italian region of Piedmont.

== History ==
Prior to producing a clothing company, the Barbera family owned and operated the Carlo Barbera wool mill, also located in Biella, Italy.

In 1962, Luciano Barbera (son of Carlo Barbera) was photographed by Ugo Mulas for Vogue in a suit made with his family's fabrics. Years later, the owner of the US menswear store Louis Boston offered Luciano to sell his line of clothes, which led the latter to create his clothing brand. In 1971, the Luciano Barbera brand of men's clothes was created, using the Carlo Barbera fabrics to make the clothes.

In 2010 the reported average price of fabric from the Carlo Barbera factory was 41 euros a meter ($48.75 a yard). That same year, the company had a $5.8 million debt and was short on orders to settle it, and the mill fabric was acquired by the Neapolitan tailoring company Kiton.

In 2014, the US private equity fund Tengram Capital Partners acquired a majority stake in Luciano Barbera and named Todd Barrato as CEO, while Carola Barbera remained as Creative Director.

In 2019 the Barbera family repurchased the Luciano Barbera apparel brand, reestablishing it as a family business, with Luciano himself as part-owner, his daughter Carola Barbera operating as Creative Director and Managing Partner, and Luciano’s son Lodovico Barbera representing the company as Global Brand Ambassador.

The initial Barbera fabric mill in Biella, Italy, was founded by Carlo Barbera (1911–2013) and has been owned by Kiton since 2010. After dying, the yarn is rested six months while it regained humidity before weaving in order to obtain the best results.

The brand opened a Luciano Barbera showroom in Milan on Via Gesù, the popular men’s clothing street.

== In popular culture ==
In the 2010 spy movie Salt, Angelina Jolie wears Luciano Barbera clothes.
