= Lanificio Carlo Barbera =

Italian wool mill

Lanificio Carlo Barbera s.r.l. is an Italian wool mill established in 1949 which has been described as "Biella's premier mill". It is currently owned by Kiton. In the second generation of the family business, Luciano Barbera established a ready-to-wear brand that is a wholly separate business.

In 2010 the company had a $5.8 million debt and was in negative cash flow, so the mill fabric was acquired by the Neapolitan luxury clothing company Kiton. The fabrics are vended by Huddersfield Fine Worsteds.

== See also ==
- Dormeuil
- Vitale Barberis Canonico
- Holland & Sherry
- Loro Piana
- Zegna
- Scabal
- PIACENZA 1733
