= Cerutti =

Cerutti is an Italian surname. Notable people with this surname include:

- Alison Cerutti (born 1985), Brazilian beach volleyball player
- Carlos Cerutti (1969–1990), Argentine basketball player
- David Cerutti (born 1974), Argentine football player
- Dominique Cerutti (born 1961), French businessman
- Ezequiel Cerutti (born 1992), Argentine footballer
- Fabio Cerutti (born 1985), Italian athlete
- Giuseppe Cerutti (1738–1792), French-Italian author and politician
- Guillaume Cerutti (born 1966), French civil servant and businessman, CEO of Christie's
- John Cerutti (1960–2004), American baseball pitcher and television analyst
- Marziale Cerutti (1895–1946), Italian general
- Susana Ruiz Cerutti (born 1940), Argentine politician
- Vincent Cerutti (born 1981), French radio and television presenter

== See also ==
- Cerutti Mastodon site
- Ceruti
- Cerruti (disambiguation)
- Cerruti
