= Scabal =

Belgian textile company

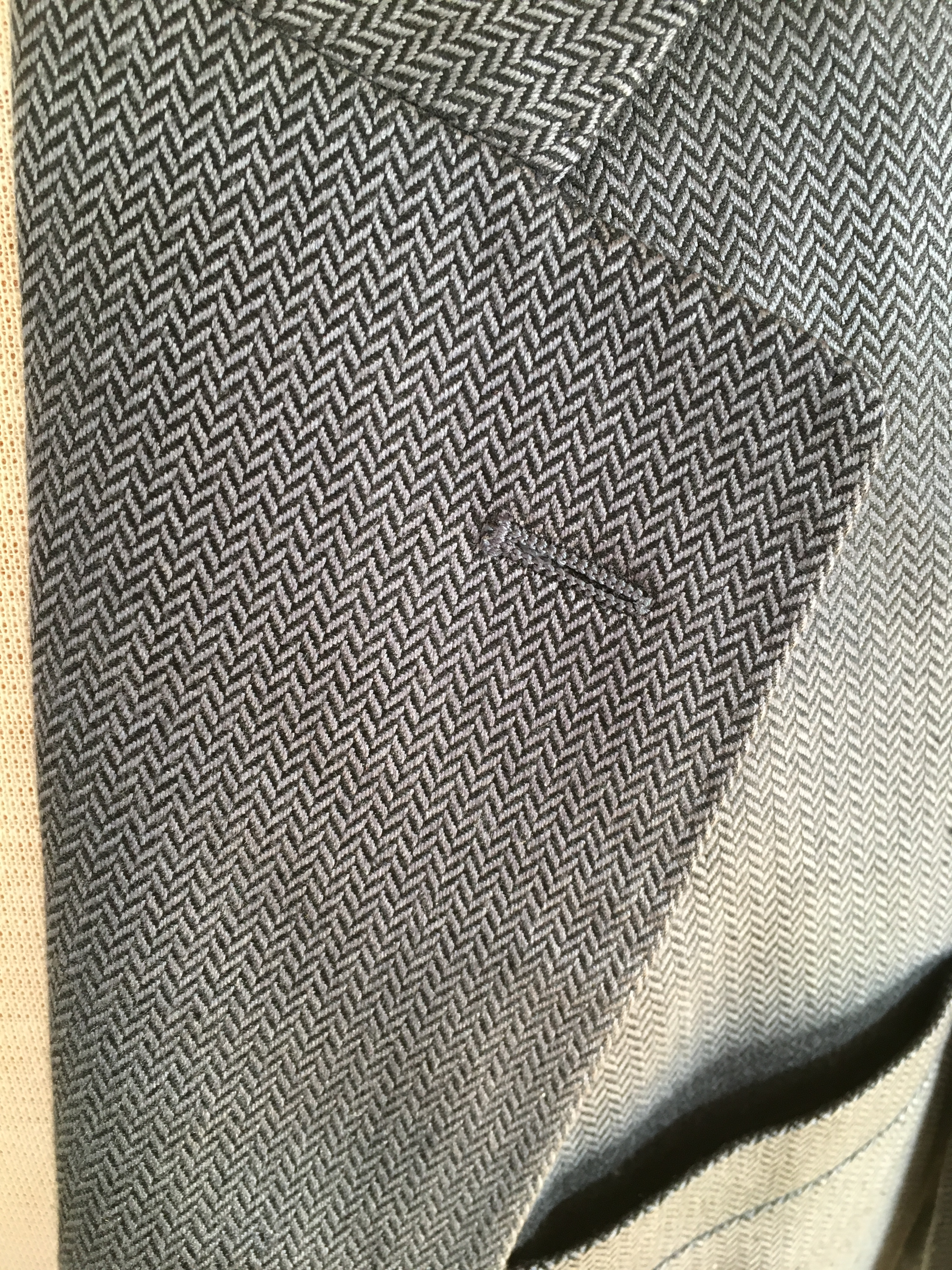
Herringbone woven cloth from Scabal on a jacket

Scabal is a Belgian textile company founded in 1938 by Otto Hertz as a cloth merchant and supplier of fabrics. "Scabal" is an acronym for Société Commerciale Anglo Belgo Allemande Luxembourgeoise.

Its headquarters are in Brussels and it now operates as a manufacturer and retailer of men's suits, jackets and shirts, as well as producing fabrics for tailors and the textile business. Most of Scabal's cloth is woven at its heritage mill in Huddersfield, England. Stefano Rivera is the current CEO of Scabal.

== Retail spaces ==
Scabal stores are located in London (Savile Row), Paris, Brussels, Geneva, Shanghai and Shenzhen.

== In popular culture ==
Marlon Brando wore Scabal in The Godfather, and Robert De Niro wore Scabal suits in Casino.

== See also ==
- Loro Piana
- Holland & Sherry
- Ermenegildo Zegna
- Carlo Barbera
- Vitale Barberis Canonico
- Dormeuil
