= Cerati (surname) =

Cerati is a surname of Italian origin. It derives from the Italian word cero, meaning 'to curl'. Notable people with the surname include:

- Antonio Cerati (1738–1816), Italian philologist
- Benito Cerati (born 1993), Chilean singer
- Carla Cerati (1926–2016), Italian photographer and writer
- Carlo Cerati (1865–1948), Italian sculptor
- Cesare Cerati (1899–1969), Italian journalist, veteran, and futurist
- Davide Cerati (born 1956), Italian photographer
- Gustavo Cerati (1959–2014), Argentine musician and singer-songwriter
- Julián Cerati (born 1998), Argentinian actor
- Lino Cerati (1938–2025), Italian sports shooter
- Lisa Cerati (born 1996), Chilean singer
- Mario Luigi Cerati (1876–1913), Italian journalist
- Umberto Cerati (1911–1994), Italian long-distance runner
- Vincenza Cerati Rivolta (1905–2000), Italian pianist

== See also ==
- Cerruti (surname)
