= Individualized Apparel Group =

Clothes manufacturer

- Formerly: Tom James Company
- Type: holding company
- Industry: clothing retailer
- Founded: 1966; 60 years ago
- Founder: Spencer Hays
- Key people: Joe Blair (President)
- Website: www.iagapparel.com

Individualized Apparel Group is a holding company that owns Oxxford Clothes, Holland & Sherry, Gitman Bros, H. Freeman, Corbin, Coppley, Individualized Shirts, and Measure Up Custom Shirts. Joe Blair is its president. Spencer Hays founded the company originally as Tom James Company in 1966, which still sells men’s suits via appointments in offices or homes. Individualized Apparel Group began in 1973 with the acquisition of the Individualized Shirt factory in Perth Amboy, New Jersey.

== History ==
Spencer Hays founded the Tom James Company in 1966 as a custom clothing business. The company later developed a vertically integrated manufacturing and retail model, and its subsequent growth was built through the acquisition of manufacturing authorities in the custom clothing industry.

The Individualized Apparel Group originated in 1973 with the acquisition of the Individualized Shirt factory in Perth Amboy, New Jersey. The group expanded with the later addition of English American, a custom suit maker with roots extending back more than a century. In the years that followed, IAG developed as part of the broader Tom James manufacturing and brand network, adding or operating heritage apparel businesses including Gitman Bros. in Ashland, Pennsylvania, Corbin Trousers, Measure Up Shirt Makers, and Oxxford Clothes. Oxxford Clothes became part of the Tom James family in 1994 and later supplied the company’s highest make of tailored clothing.

In 2012, Individualized Apparel Group signed an agreement to purchase substantially all of the assets of Coppley Corp., a Canadian custom clothing manufacturer, from the bankrupt HMX Group.
