= Maria Giovanna Paone =

Italian fashion executive

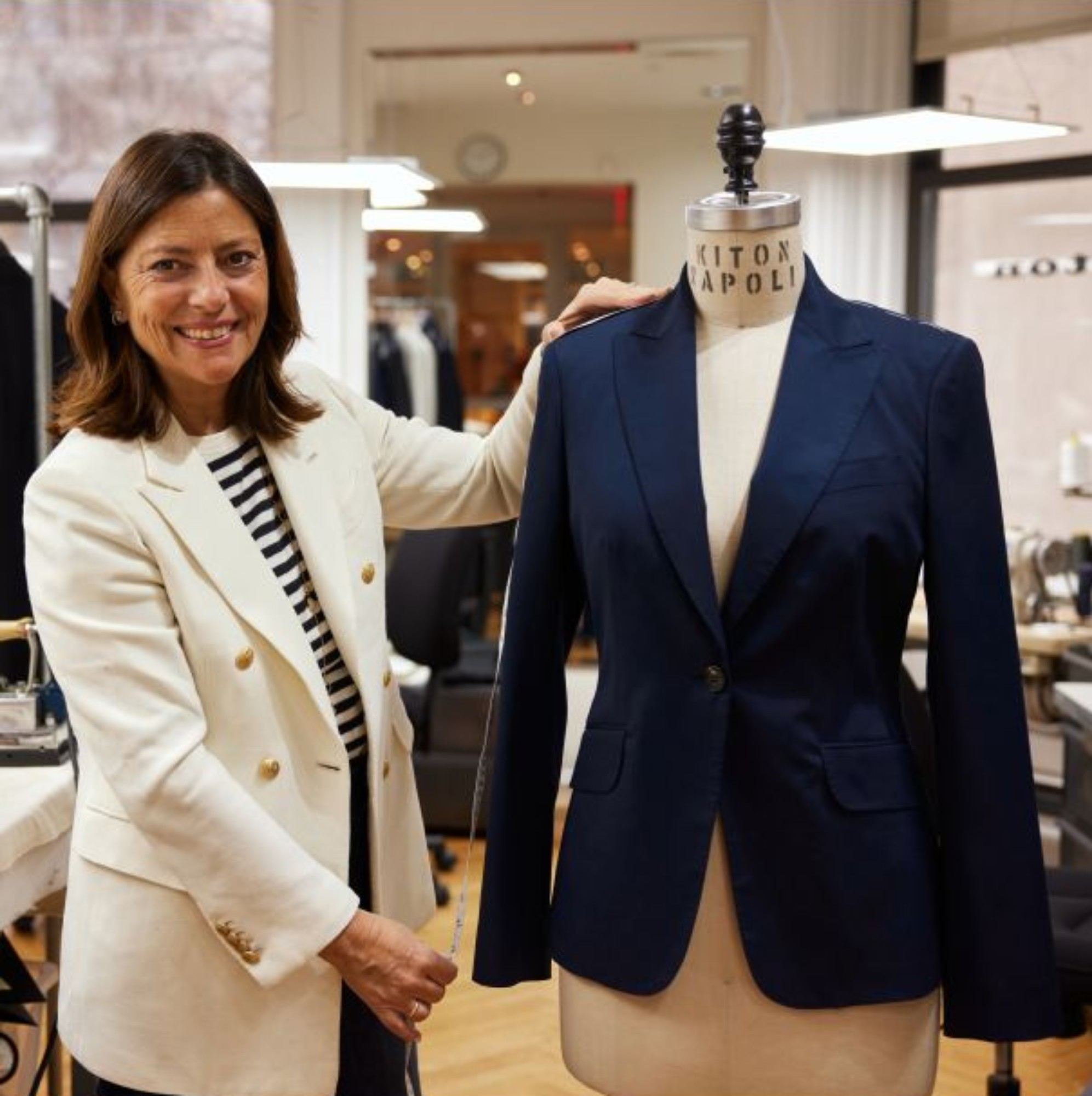
- Maria Giovanna Paone
- Born: 28 February 1967 (age 59)
- Occupation: Fashion executive
- Known for: President of Kiton

Maria Giovanna Paone (born 28 February 1967) is an Italian fashion executive. She is the president and the creative director of the womenswear division at Kiton, a luxury fashion company founded by her father, Ciro Paone, in 1968.

== Early life and education ==
Paone studied in Brighton, England before joining Kiton.

== Career ==
Paone joined Kiton in 1986. She is a proponent of slow fashion and describes her role as the vice president and creative director of the Women's Division.

In 1995, Paone introduced a line of womenswear at Kiton. Paone and her team have been working on new accessories for the women's collection.

In 2021 she received the Italian Forbes CEO Award in the Fashion category.

== Personal life ==
She is married to Michele Klain, a doctor from Naples. They have two children.
