= Gitman Bros =

American men's shirt and necktie manufacturer

- Industry: Fashion
- Founded: 1978; 47 years ago
- Headquarters: Ashland, Pennsylvania, United States
- Products: Shirts, neckties
- Parent: Individualized Apparel Group

Gitman Bros is a men's shirt and necktie manufacturer. It is one of the few remaining made in America clothing companies. Currently owned by Individualized Apparel Group, Gitman Bros is sold in 30 countries.

== History ==
Based in Ashland, Pennsylvania, the original Gitman Bros was founded in 1978, with a history going back to 1932 as the Ashland Shirt & Pajama Co.

Gitman Vintage was launched in 2008.

Owing to rising costs and an insufficient volume of orders exacerbated by the COVID-19 pandemic, Gitman ceased production in June 2020; Gitman's parent company combined manufacturing with affiliate manufacturing companies located in Tennessee and New Jersey. In September 2020 Brigade Industries, a federal clothing contractor, announced its intention to reopen the former Gitman Ashland operations as a contract facility.

== See also ==
- Alden Shoe Company
- Horween Leather Company
- Cone Mills Corporation
