= Holland & Sherry =

London fabric mill founded in 1836

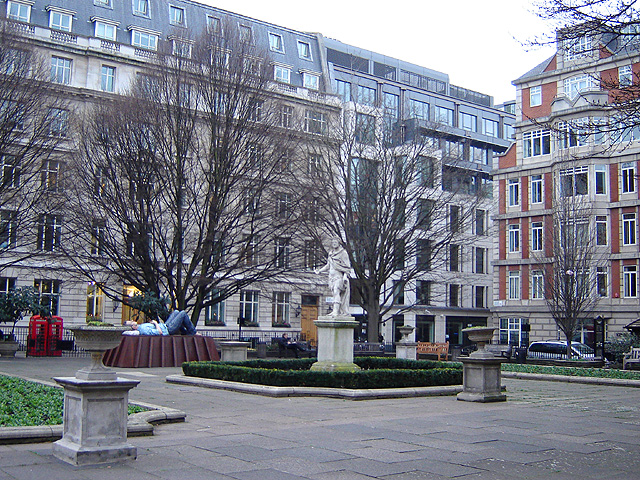
In 1886 Holland & Sherry moved premises to Golden Square, at the time the epicenter of the woolen merchanting trade.

Holland & Sherry is a fabric merchant founded in London in 1836 by Stephen George Holland and Frederick Sherry. It is owned by Individualized Apparel Group as of March 2003.

== History ==
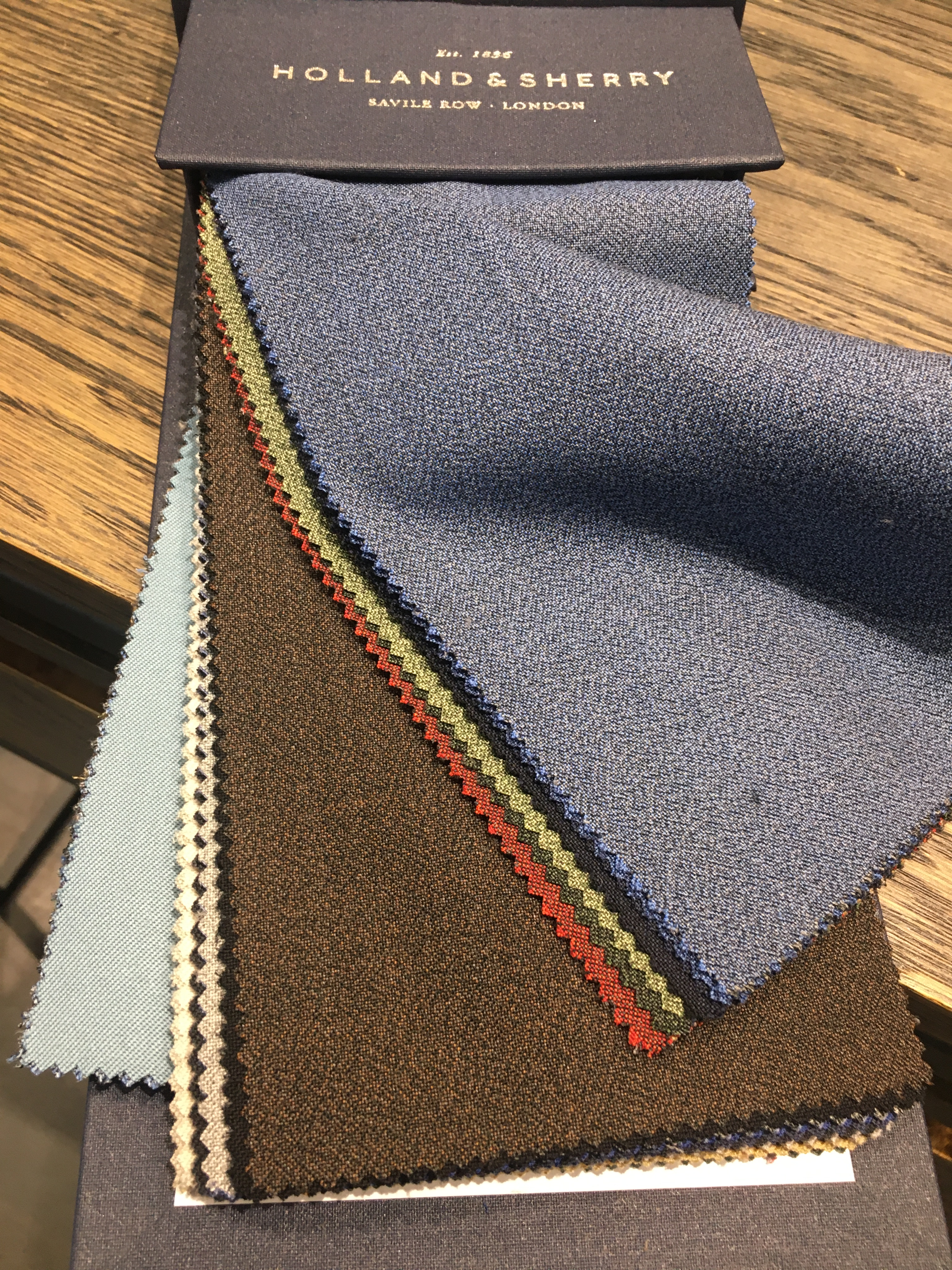
Fabric samples from Holland & Sherry

Holland & Sherry began as merchants at 10 Old Bond Street, London, specializing in woolen and silk cloths. In 1886 Holland & Sherry moved premises to Golden Square, at the time the center of the woolen merchanting trade. By 1900 the firm was exporting to many countries, it was around that time a sales office was established in New York. In the early part of the 20th century, the United Kingdom, Europe, North and South America were the dominant markets for the company. Amongst other distribution arrangements, there was a Holland & Sherry warehouse in St. Petersburg, Russia – a successful market prior to the revolution and now being successfully renewed. By 1982 the business moved to Savile Row - initially 9-10, moving to No. 31 in 2022. Holland & Sherry provide fabrics to tailors and couture designers throughout the world.

== See also ==
- Ermenegildo Zegna
- Loro Piana
- Dormeuil
- Vitale Barberis Canonico
- Scabal
- Gladson
