= Marta Cerruti =

Biomaterials chemist

- Born: 1978 or 1979 (age 47–48)

Academic background
- Education: University of Turin (PhD)
- Thesis: Characterization of bioactive glasses effect of the immersion in solutions that simulate body fluids (2004)

Academic work
- Discipline: Biomaterials
- Institutions: McGill University

Marta Giulia Cerruti is a biomaterials chemist at McGill University and Tier 1 Canada Research Chair.

== Early life and education ==
Marta Cerruti was born in northern Italy. Both her parents were mathematicians, and she described being described quizzed on math problems at a young age.

Cerruti earned both a laurea and then PhD in chemistry at the University of Turin, graduating in 2004 with a thesis studying bioactive glasses for bone regeneration. Following graduation, she held 2 two-year post-doctoral positions at North Carolina State University and UC Berkeley.

== Career ==
Cerruti joined McGill University in September 2009 as an assistant professor in the Department of Mining and Materials Engineering. Her research initially concentrated on the interactions between inorganic material surfaces and biological molecules, including the development of biomaterials designed to encourage the regeneration of bone and cartilage. Cerruti runs the "biointerface lab" studying surface phenomena, with a focus on the interface between synthetic materials and biological molecules.

Cerruti was promoted to full professor in January 2022. In 2024, Cerruti was appointed a Tier 1 Canada Research Chair in Sex, Age and Calcification Diseases. She is the president of the Canadian Chapter of the Controlled Release Society.

== Honours ==
- Member: Royal Society of Canada (College of New Scholars, Artists, and Scientists; 2019)
- World Economic Forum Young Scientist (2017)

== Select publications ==
- Cerruti, Marta; Greenspan, David; Powers, Kevin (2005). "Effect of pH and ionic strength on the reactivity of Bioglass® 45S5". Biomaterials. 26 (14): 1665–1674. doi:10.1016/j.biomaterials.2004.07.009. PMID 15576140.
- Eimar, Hazem; Siciliano, Ryan; Abdallah, Mohamed-Nur; Nader, Samer Abi; Amin, Wala M.; Martinez, Pedro-Pablo; Celemin, Alicia; Cerruti, Marta; Tamimi, Faleh (2012). "Hydrogen peroxide whitens teeth by oxidizing the organic structure". Journal of Dentistry. 40: e25–e33. doi:10.1016/j.jdent.2012.08.008. PMID 22925924.
- Bornapour, M.; Muja, N.; Shum-Tim, D.; Cerruti, M.; Pekguleryuz, M. (2013). "Biocompatibility and biodegradability of Mg–Sr alloys: The formation of Sr-substituted hydroxyapatite". Acta Biomaterialia. 9 (2): 5319–5330. doi:10.1016/j.actbio.2012.07.045. PMID 22871640.
- Li, Chaoxu; Born, Anne-Kathrin; Schweizer, Thomas; Zenobi-Wong, Marcy; Cerruti, Marta; Mezzenga, Raffaele (2014). "Amyloid-Hydroxyapatite Bone Biomimetic Composites". Advanced Materials. 26 (20): 3207–3212. Bibcode:2014AdM....26.3207L. doi:10.1002/adma.201306198. PMID 24634054.
- Xu, Jinke; Strandman, Satu; Zhu, Julian X.X.; Barralet, Jake; Cerruti, Marta (2015). "Genipin-crosslinked catechol-chitosan mucoadhesive hydrogels for buccal drug delivery". Biomaterials. 37: 395–404. doi:10.1016/j.biomaterials.2014.10.024. PMID 25453967.
- Jalani, Ghulam; Naccache, Rafik; Rosenzweig, Derek H.; Haglund, Lisbet; Vetrone, Fiorenzo; Cerruti, Marta (2016). "Photocleavable Hydrogel-Coated Upconverting Nanoparticles: A Multifunctional Theranostic Platform for NIR Imaging and On-Demand Macromolecular Delivery". Journal of the American Chemical Society. 138 (3): 1078–1083. Bibcode:2016JAChS.138.1078J. doi:10.1021/jacs.5b12357. PMID 26708288.
- Tavafoghi, M.; Cerruti, M. (2016). "The role of amino acids in hydroxyapatite mineralization". Journal of the Royal Society Interface. 13 (123) 20160462. doi:10.1098/rsif.2016.0462. PMC 5095212. PMID 27707904.
