= Isabel Cerruti =

Brazilian anarchist (1886 – 1970)

- Born: 19 August 1886; São Paulo, Brazil
- Died: 1 January 1970 (aged 83); São Paulo, Brazil
- Other name: Isa Ruti

Philosophical work
- Region: Brazil
- School: Anarchist communism; Anarcho-syndicalism; Feminism

Isabel Cerruti, also known by her pseudonym Isa Ruti (19 August 1886 – 1 January 1970) was a Brazilian weaver, journalist, activist, and anarcho-communist, feminist, and anarcho-syndicalist intellectual. A significant figure in the Brazilian anarchist movement and more broadly in the Brazilian left of the time, her thought remains difficult to grasp due to a lack of studies and the abundance of writings she left behind. Additionally, she co-founded the International Feminine Federation (IFF) alongside Maria Lacerda de Moura.

From 1911 until her death, she regularly wrote for anarchist publications.

== Biography ==
Isabel Bertolucci was born in São Paulo on 19 August 1886. Her mother, Maria Emília Ferreira da Silva, was a Brazilian who worked as a domestic servant, while her father, Luigi Bertolucci, was an Italian born in 1860 who also worked in the same profession. Her maternal grandfather, Joaquim Ferreira da Silva, is said to have participated in the Paraguayan War. She was baptized in the parish of Bon Jesus de Brás on 10 October 1886. She subsequently worked as a weaver, as well as a teacher and piano instructor.

Between the ages of 17 and 20, she became politically active, particularly by reading anarchist literature. She quickly acquired a solid general knowledge and developed a strong interest in sociology. This political formation coincided with her engagement to Américo Cerruti, an anarchist with whom she exchanged ideas. During this time, she was still Catholic and participated in religious congregations when they appeared at her workplace. Her fiancé then gifted her the anarchist newspaper A Lanterna, and since she enjoyed it, he arranged for it to be sent to her weekly. Gradually, she adopted more pronounced anti-clerical positions and began to support free unions.

She married him in 1908 and adopted his last name. Their relationship lasted until his death in November 1954. When A Lanterna ceased publication and she began reading A Plebe, she found it to be even more to her liking. She became an avid reader of the newspaper before starting to write articles under various pseudonyms, the most well-known being Isa Ruti. She began writing for the newspaper in 1911, initially producing anti-clerical texts, and gradually moved on to openly anarchist writings. Her activities led to her being recognized in the streets by fellow anarchists. Cerruti was connected to the Italian anarchist community in Brazil and wrote for some of their publications, such as La Difesa. She feared being deported to Italy by the Brazilian police, who spied on her and used such methods to eliminate political opponents. From the 1920s onward, she participated in various revolutionary syndicalist or anarcho-syndicalist organizations.

Her actions made her an "important figure of the left in Brazil" and within the Brazilian anarchist movement. Cerruti also co-founded the International Feminine Federation (IFF) with Maria Lacerda de Moura.

She continued her activism and publications until her death in São Paulo on 1 January 1970.

== Thought ==
Cerruti developed anarcho-communist and anarcho-syndicalist thought, drawing on numerous theoretical references to prominent figures in anarchist thought, including "[our] unforgettable master and comrade Errico Malatesta" and Peter Kropotkin. It remains difficult to grasp the extent of her thought, as it spans many dense and understudied anarchist publications over nearly 50 years, ending with her death in 1970.

Moreover, Cerruti's thinking evolved over time; for example, while in the 1920s she argued that the struggle should be waged against capitalism and political domination, asserting that with their end, both women and men would see all forms of gender domination disappear, by the 1930s, she feminized her discourse and proposed responses to issues specific to women.

The activist quickly became very critical of the USSR and Marxism–Leninism, refusing to join the Communist Party when a friend invited her to do so. In 1934, Cerruti wrote an article on the subject titled "On the Peril of Russia", in which she wrote, among other things:

We could create a purely proletarian work without aligning ourselves with Russia; for, as is known, Russia has not fulfilled the full ideals of freedom for its workers. Moreover, in Russia, there still exists, after seventeen years of 'proletarian' government, a system of exchanging products for money. [...] Who knows if the patriotic fervor of Russian statesmen, in their extreme nationalist ambition, does not drive them to establish the prevalence of the Russian people over other peoples? We know the methods that deceitful leaders use to instill in the minds of the ignorant and humble people the ideas that suit them, thus creating a mentality and even a collective psychology favorable to the most audacious plans of ambition. We also know what convinced patriots are capable of when they believe that the world must remain divided and named according to the conveniences of capitalism.

Cerruti also argued that revolutionary and anarchist propaganda should be primarily directed at the military, as they would be, like other proletarians, victims of the system that exploits them. Therefore, she believed that this social group should be prioritized for political engagement.

== Bibliography ==
- Fernanda de Almeida, Daniela (2018). "Isabel Bertolucci Cerruti: vida, trajetória política e escritos de uma mulher militante (1910-1937)" (PDF). Historia & Democracia.
- Rosa da Silva, Rodrigo (2018). "Isabel Cerruti (1886-1970): uma vida dedicada ao "sonho libertário" e ao "triunfo da anarquia". O triunfo da Anarquia e outros escritos.
