= Gladson =

Gladson is a given name. Notable people with the name include:

- Gladson Awako (born 1990), Ghanaian footballer
- Gládson Barbosa (born 1979), Brazilian steeplechase runner
- Gladson Cameli (born 1978), Brazilian politician
- Gladson do Nascimento (born 1986), Brazilian footballer
- Gladson Dungdung, Indian activist and writer
