= Nino Cerruti =

Italian businessman and stylist (1930–2022)

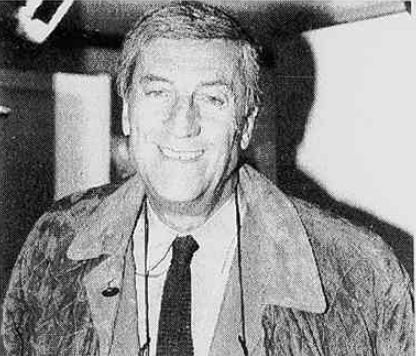
- Born: 25 September 1930; Biella, Italy
- Died: 15 January 2022 (aged 91); Vercelli, Italy
- Occupations: Businessman, designer, stylist
- Known for: Founder of Cerruti 1881

Nino Cerruti (25 September 1930 – 15 January 2022) was an Italian businessman and stylist. He founded his own haute couture house, Cerruti 1881, in 1967 in Paris. He managed the Italian family business Lanificio Fratelli Cerruti, which was founded in 1881 by his grandfather.

== Early life and career ==
Cerruti was born in Biella, Italy, on 25 September 1930. He became the head of the family's woollen business after his father's untimely death. His grandfather had founded a textile mill in Biella in 1881 (Lanificio Fratelli Cerruti). Drawing from his experience in producing excellent fabrics, Cerruti ventured into the production of clothing in the late 1950s. His first men's collection, Hitman, was shown in 1957 and was considered a revolution in men's wear at the time. From 1964 to 1970, Giorgio Armani, who later founded his eponymous fashion empire in 1974, worked for Cerruti at Hitman. Eventually, in 1967, the Cerruti menswear line was launched, which was to be followed by a womenswear collection a year later.

The first Cerruti boutique opened in 1967 in Place de la Madeleine in Paris, where Cerruti moved the company's headquarters in order to be closer to the international fashion capital. The fabric production under the name of Lanificio Fratelli Cerruti and the Hitman label remained in Italy. Cerruti, Lanificio Cerruti of Biella and Hitman, based out of Corsico, together formed Fratelli Cerruti, the Cerruti Brothers group.

Over the years, Cerruti offered womenswear and menswear, the Cerruti 1881 diffusion line, Cerruti Arte, Cerruti Jeans, the Cerruti Brothers business collection for men, and Cerruti 1881 Shapes for the Asian market, as well as fragrances and accessories. Later, the clothing lines were regrouped under the Cerruti 1881 name. The brand is particularly associated with classic wool suiting luxury read-to-wear fashion.

In 1978, the Cerruti house made an entry into the world of fine fragrance with Nino Cerruti pour Homme which was soon to be followed by Cerruti 1881 pour Homme in 1990 and Cerruti Image in 1998, among other fragrances.

In the 1980s, Cerruti began a collaboration with cinema. From Bonnie and Clyde, Pretty Woman to Basic Instinct, the brand Cerruti designed clothes for actors such as Michael Douglas, Jack Nicholson, Tom Hanks, Bruce Willis, Sharon Stone, Julia Roberts, Robert Redford, Harrison Ford, Al Pacino, and Jean Paul Belmondo. He made cameo appearances in the following Hollywood movies: Holy Man (1998), Catwalk (1996), and Cannes Man (1996).

== Later career and retirement ==
In 1994, Cerruti was the official designer of Scuderia Ferrari. In 1996, he named Narciso Rodriguez, a former Anne Klein, Calvin Klein, and TSE designer, to be the creative director of Cerruti. The following year, he replaced Rodriguez with Peter Speliopoulos, a DKNY designer.

In October 2000, Cerruti sold 51% of his company to Fin.Part, an Italian industrial group. Less than a year later, the group bought the rest of the company and forced 71-year-old Nino Cerruti out of it, claiming irreconcilable differences. "There was a perpetual conflict of interest", Cerruti said later. Hence, the Spring Summer 2002 collection marked the end of Cerruti fashion being designed by Nino Cerruti.

== Film costumes and films ==
He made the clothes for these films:

- 2000 – American Psycho - Christian Bale
- 1997 – Air Force One - Harrison Ford
- 1997 – As good as it gets - Jack Nicholson
- 1994 – Prêt-à-porter - Marcello Mastroianni
- 1993 – Indecent Proposal - Robert Redford
- 1993 – Philadelphia - Tom Hanks
- 1992 – Basic Instinct - Michael Douglas
- 1991 – Silence of the Lambs - Scott Glenn
- 1990 – Pretty Woman - Richard Gere
- 1987 – Wall Street - Michael Douglas
- 1987 – Fatal attraction - Michael Douglas
- 1987 – The Witches of Eastwick - Jack Nicholson
- 1985 – Jewel of Nile - Michael Douglas

He played himself in these films:

- Holy Man (1998)
- Catwalk (1995)
- Cannes Man (1996)

== Personal life and death ==
Following his departure in 2000, Cerruti concentrated on the family-owned textile mill business called Lanificio Fratelli Cerruti, which is located in Biella. He did not cut all ties with the fashion house, and always attended the Cerruti fashion shows, seated in the front row.

Cerruti died from complications of hip surgery in Vercelli, on 15 January 2022, at the age of 91.

== Awards ==
Year	Title
1978	Bath Museum of Costume Dress of the Year award, England
1981	Munich Fashion Week Award
1982 1988	Cutty Sark Men's Fashion Awards
1986	Pitti Uomo award, Italy
