= Kiton =

Italian luxury fashion house

- Native name: Ciro Paone S.p.A.
- Type: Private
- Industry: Fashion (menswear)
- Founded: 1968; 58 years ago Arzano, Campania, Italy
- Founder: Ciro Paone
- Key people: Antonio De Matteis (CEO), Maria Giovanna Paone (vice-president and the creative director) Antonio Paone (president of Kiton USA)
- Revenue: €160 million (2022)
- Number of employees: About 850 (2022)
- Website: https://kiton.com

Kiton is an Italian fashion house founded by Ciro Paone in Arzano, Campania, in 1968. Its roots are in traditional Italian tailoring. By the end of 2022, Kiton had 60 monobrand stores and 300 wholesale accounts worldwide.

The company's slogan is Il meglio del meglio più uno ("the best of the best plus one").

Kiton operates five manufacturing facilities located in Arzano (for their primary production), Caserta (for sportswear), Parma (for outerwear), Fidenza (for knitwear), and Biella (for textiles). Kiton owns the Carlo Barbera fabric mill.

== History ==
Kiton button-fly jeans

Kiton is the trademark brand of the company Ciro Paone SpA, a company founded in 1956. It was set up at Arzano, in the province of Naples, in 1968. The name Kiton derives from the chiton ceremonial tunic worn by the ancient Greeks and Romans. The word chiton is derived from Ancient Greek χιτών (khitṓn, “tunic”), from a Central Semitic language *kittān (as in Maltese) from the Akkadian𒌆𒃰 (kitû, literally “flax, linen”), from Sumerian 𒄑𒃰 (kitû [GIŠ.GADA]).

In 1995, Kiton launched a line of womenswear.

In 2008, Ciro Paone purchased suits and other wardrobe items that once belonged to Edward VIII, the Duke of Windsor, from a 1998 Sotheby's auction. These items were later showcased by Paone at the Excelsior hotel in Florence, Italy, during the biannual Pitti Uomo menswear show. The display highlighted the historical sartorial elements Paone incorporated into his contemporary designs for Kiton suits.

In 2009, Kiton bought the Carlo Barbera woollen mill, which had been founded in 1949 in Biella. This allowed Kiton to work with delicate fibers such as viscose and create specialized yarns, dyes, and weaves.

In 2013, Kiton acquired Palazzo Ferré, a building on Via Pontaccio that was home to the Gianfranco Ferré label for 14 years. After the restoration, it was planned that the second floor would house Kiton's showroom and offices, while the first floor would become a tailor's shop.

In 2013, Kiton launched its retail operations in India. In 2015, Kiton launched its eyewear collection, and opened a 2,500-square-foot store in San Francisco. In 2017 to mark the opening of Pitti Immagine Uomo 91, Ciro Paone received the Pitti Immagine career award.

In 2018, Kiton launched an athleisure collection, called KNT (Kiton New Texture). The KNT brand is owned by twins Walter and Mariano de Matteis, the latest generation of the Kiton family. Also, in 2018, Sergio Mattarella, President of the Italian Republic, awarded Kiton the Premio Leonardo Qualità Italia.

Ciro Paone, the founder of Kiton, died at 88 in his home in Naples, Italy on October 27, 2021.

In 2022, Kiton announced a new collaboration with Beatrice Venezi. In July 2023, Kiton began dressing the team and players of the London club Tottenham Hotspur for official events.

In July 2023, Kiton opened a 350 sq m flagship store in Seoul in Cheongdam-dong.

== School of Advanced Tailoring ==
In 2000, Kiton launched a training project with the foundation of the School of Advanced Tailoring, aimed at training new generations of tailors. Kiton developed this course with two main goals: to prepare young people to enter the labor market and to ensure that the workforce is constantly updated.

The majority of the students hail from Naples, though there are also applications from international students. Approximately 80% of these students secure employment with Kiton or at other companies.

The institution offers a three-year program aimed at training individuals between the ages of 16 and 21 for professional roles. The curriculum, delivered by in-house instructors, primarily focuses on jacket creation during the first two years. In the third year, students are encouraged to pick and delve deeper into a specific production stage.

== Production ==
Kiton operates in the luxury goods sector and offers bespoke service, characterized by hand-cut and basted tailored suits, as well as ready-to-wear men's and women's garments.

Kiton maintains an integrated supply chain, with five company-owned factories:

- Coats, jackets, shirts, ties, shoes, and small leather goods are produced at the company's headquarters in Arzano.
- Leather and bomber jackets are crafted in Collecchio.
- Knitwear originates from Fidenza.
- Jeans are produced in Marcianise, in the province of Caserta.
- Fabrics are processed and developed at Biella, Kiton's proprietary woolen mill.

As of the end of 2022, the company employs about 850 employees and sells its products in 73 countries, with over 60 monobrand stores and 300 wholesale accounts globally.

== Management ==
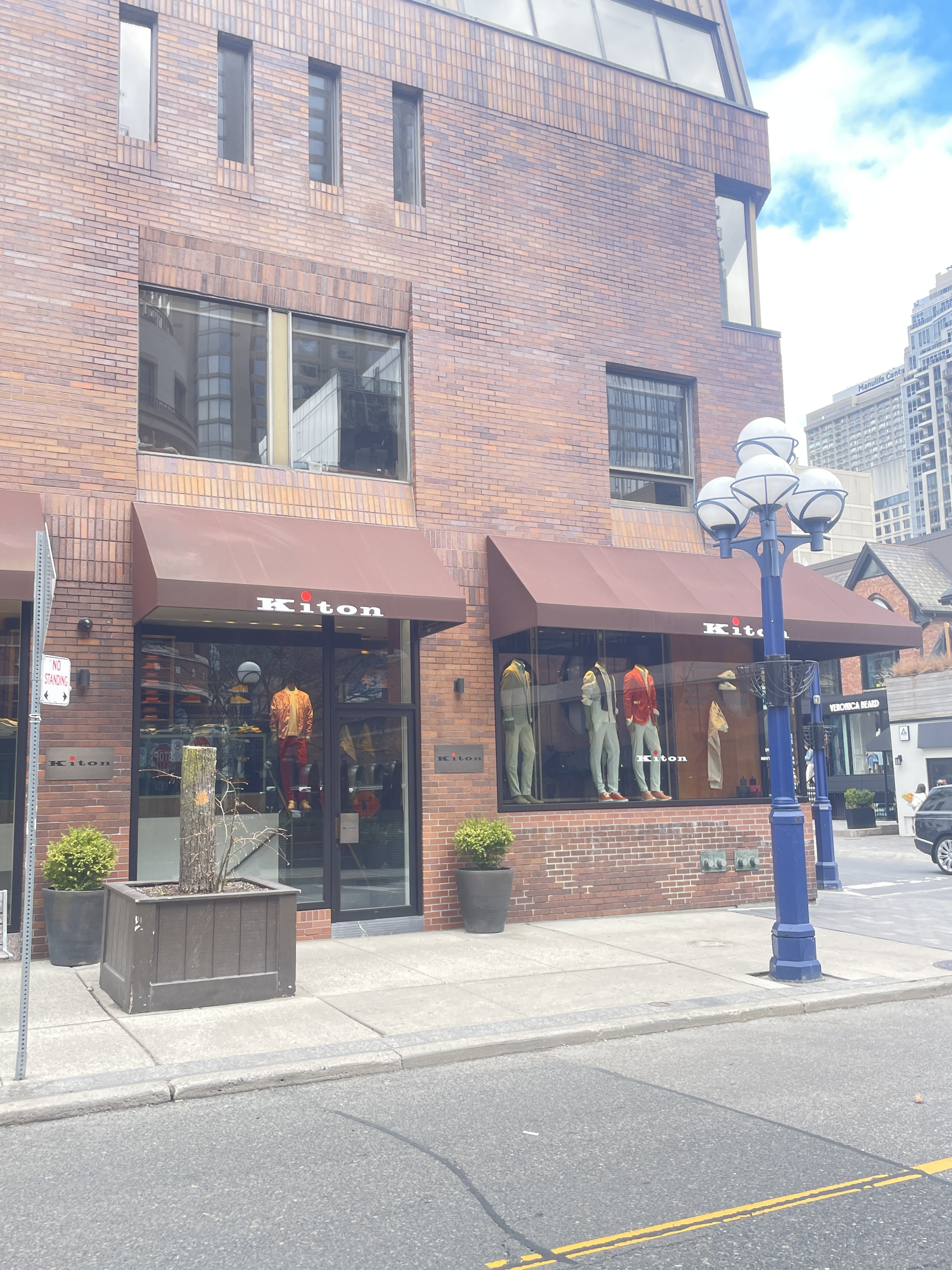
Kiton in Toronto

=== Antonio de Matteis (CEO) ===
Antonio de Matteis, the nephew of Ciro Paone, is the CEO and joint Creative Director of menswear at Kiton Group. Born in Naples in 1964, he started his career at Kiton under his uncle Ciro Paone, the founder of Kiton. In 1996, Antonio joined the Ciro Paone spa shareholder package, acquiring a 10% stake. By 2007, Ciro Paone appointed him as the CEO of the group. In 2018, Antonio initiated "Knt (Kiton new textures)", the first collection by his sons, Mariano and Walter De Matteis, representing the third generation of the Kiton family. In 2021–2022, Kiton saw a 60% increase in turnover, reaching €162 million.

=== Maria Giovanna Paone (president) ===
Maria Giovanna Paone, daughter of Ciro Paone, is the president and the creative director of the brand's womenswear.

Maria Giovanna joined Kiton in 1986 and, under her leadership in 1995, introduced a line of womenswear. Paone currently holds the positions of president and creative director of the womenswear division at Kiton. She is an advocate for slow fashion and has been instrumental in expanding the women's collection with new accessories. Under Paone, the women's collection emphasized tailored jackets suitable for a range of settings and customers. By 2013, womenswear accounted for 20% of Kiton's total growth, with a marked presence in international markets, including Japan, Korea, Canada, and the U.S. The line's success also led to the development of a women's accessories range. Paone recognized the growing interest of women in high-end tailoring, a field often associated with men. In recognition of her contributions to the fashion industry, Paone received the Italian Forbes CEO Award in the Fashion category in 2021.

=== Antonio Paone (president of Kiton USA) ===
Antonio Paone is the president of Kiton USA. He began his career at Kiton, working from the ground up, starting as a driver and later becoming a fabric scout across Europe. By 2004, he had risen to the role of commercial director and subsequently oversaw Kiton's US operations. Under his leadership, Kiton has expanded, notably with a new women's store on Madison Avenue, and he also spearheaded the growth of Sartorio Napoli, a Kiton family brand.

== See also ==
- Made in Italy
