= Dormeuil =

French company

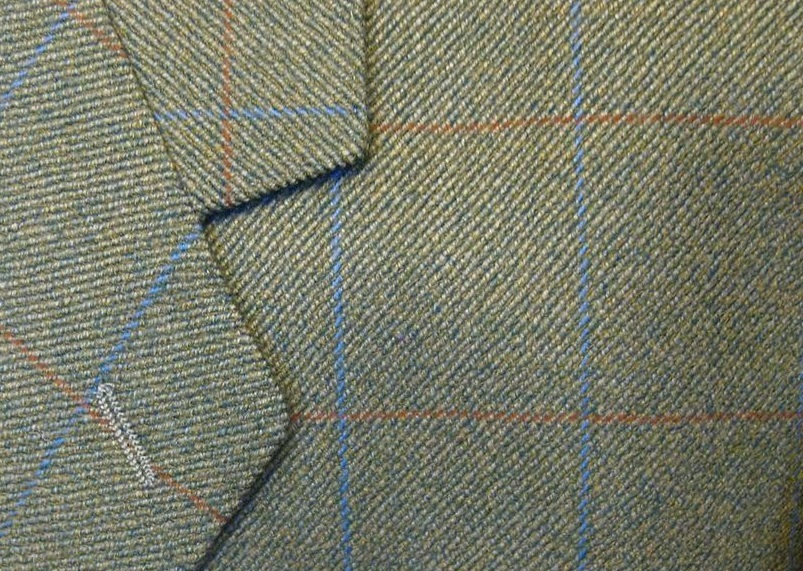
Tweed fabric on jacket from Dormeuil

Dormeuil is a French family business founded in 1842 manufacturing high-end clothing fabrics, and owning its own brand of men's ready-to-wear since 2002. The Dormeuil family has run the business since its inception, and it is currently Dominic Dormeuil who is at the head of the group. The head office is located in France in the town of Wissous in the Île-de-France region. The "Minova" production unit is located in the United Kingdom, in Dewsbury in the county of Yorkshire. The company is also represented by subsidiaries in seven countries.

Dormeuil Frères SAS handles the marketing of fabrics with its distribution subsidiaries; Dormeuil Mode offers ready-to-wear and made-to-measure in its Parisian showroom. Dormeuil has offices in London, Paris, Milan, New Delhi, Shanghai, Tokyo, Melbourne and New York.

== History ==
Dormeuil was founded in 1842 by 22-year-old Jules Dormeuil. The business began with importing English fabrics to France. By 1862 its headquarters were established at 4 rue Vivienne in Paris. The first shop outside France was located at 10 New Burlington Street in London.

In 1842, Jules Dormeuil, great-grandson of a cloth merchant, was employed in a cloth trading business, the company “Dumont Frères”, where he became a partner after just one year thanks to the ingenious idea to import sheets from England to resell them in France. His two brothers, Alfred and Auguste, joined him in 1858. The company was renamed “A. Dumont & J. Dormeuil”, then “A. Dumont et Dormeuil frères” by acquiring new premises at 4 rue Vivienne in Paris. The Dormeuil company was moved to England because of the Franco-Prussian War of 1870. This situation, which repeated itself several times during the 20th century, deeply anchored the brand in a dual Franco-British heritage.

At the end of the 19th century, the Dormeuil company opened its first office in New York. Then, at the beginning of the century, the Dormeuil family began to forge important ties with Japan. The House of Dormeuil was built in 1926 in London, on Warwick Street near the famous tailors' district of Savile Row. The company is also expanding in the United States, Africa and Asia. In addition, the house is launching its new fabric worldwide, “Sportex5,6”, the first innovation in a long line and the first fabric to bear a name.

The 1950s marked the opening of the brand's first two subsidiaries in Milan and Düsseldorf. In 1974, the company moved to Palaiseau, near Orly, where it built its own premises. In 1992, the company celebrated its 150th anniversary, and for the occasion, the lights of the Eiffel Tower went out. In 1999, Dominic Dormeuil took over the management of the company. The strategy of this new CEO is to find new fibers and new innovative weaving techniques.

In 2008, a new subsidiary was opened in New Delhi, then in Shanghai in 2010 on the anniversary of 120 years of Dormeuil's presence in China. In 2011, the Dormeuil head office was moved: it left Palaiseau for Wissous.

In 2025, Dormeuil acquired Alfred Brown Ltd, a family-owned British fabric mill founded in 1915 in Yorkshire.

== See also ==
- Loro Piana
- Holland & Sherry
- Ermenegildo Zegna
- Vitale Barberis Canonico
- Scabal
