= Cerruti 1881 =

French fashion house

- Type: Subsidiary
- Industry: Fashion
- Founded: 1967; 59 years ago
- Founder: Nino Cerruti
- Headquarters: Paris, France
- Number of locations: 84 stores in 34 cities in China, Hong Kong, Macau and Taiwan (2021)
- Area served: Worldwide
- Products: Clothing, fashion accessories, jewelry, perfumes, watches
- Parent: Shandong Ruyi
- Website: www.cerruti.com

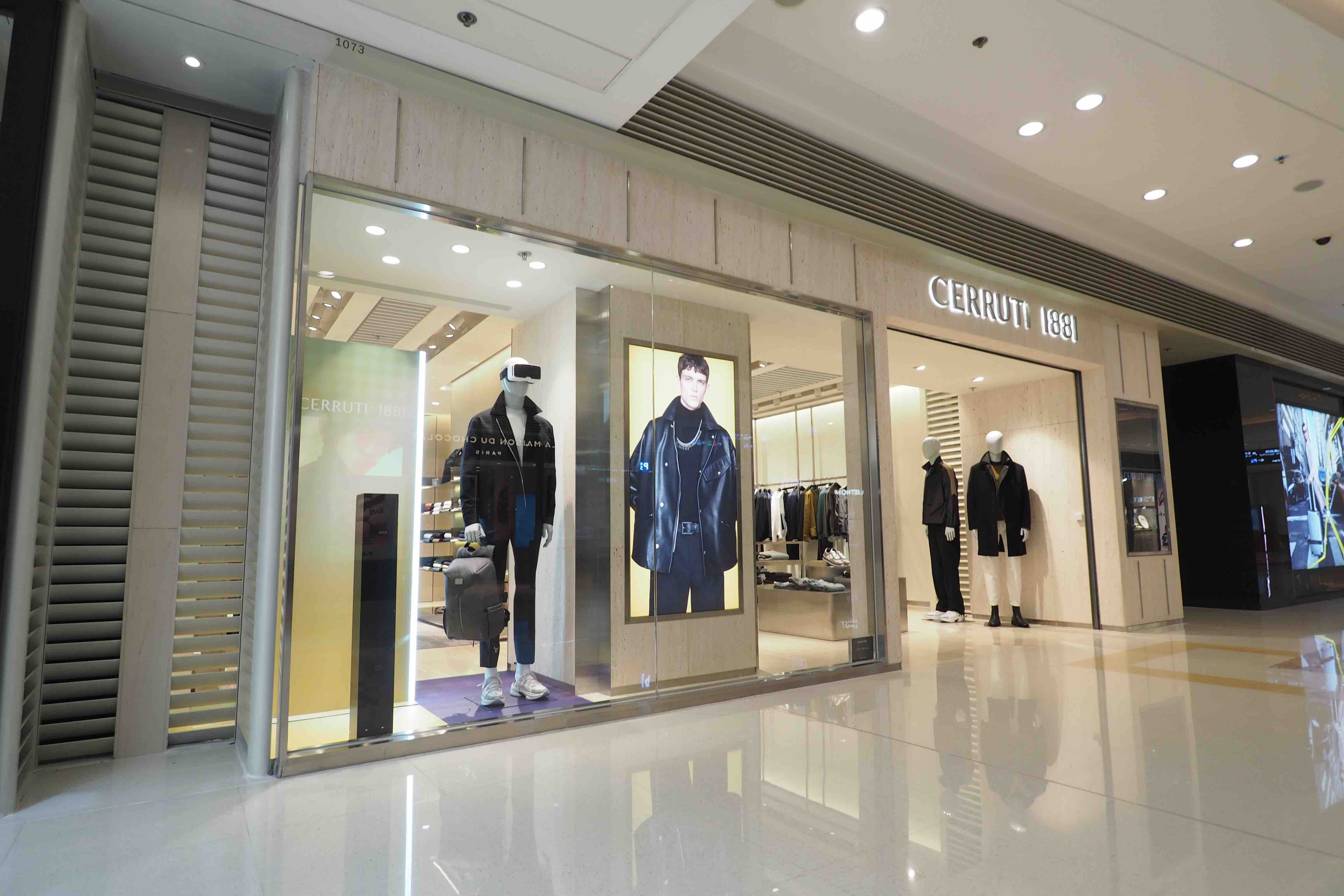
Cerruti 1881 Elements store in Hong Kong

Cerruti 1881, also known as Cerruti, is an Italian luxury fashion house founded by Nino Cerruti in 1967 and headquartered in Paris. It was named "1881" because Nino's grandfather established the family wool mill, Lanificio Fratelli Cerruti, in 1881.

Cerruti flagship store is at 3 Place de la Madeleine in the Right Bank. The headquarters of the company are at 27 rue Royale in Paris.

Cerruti 1881 luxury fashion house is owned by the Hong Kong conglomerate Trinity Ltd., which was purchased by its current parent company Shandong Ruyi in 2017. Shandong Ruyi is the largest textile manufacturer in China and has expressed ambitions to become the Chinese equivalent of LVMH.

== History ==
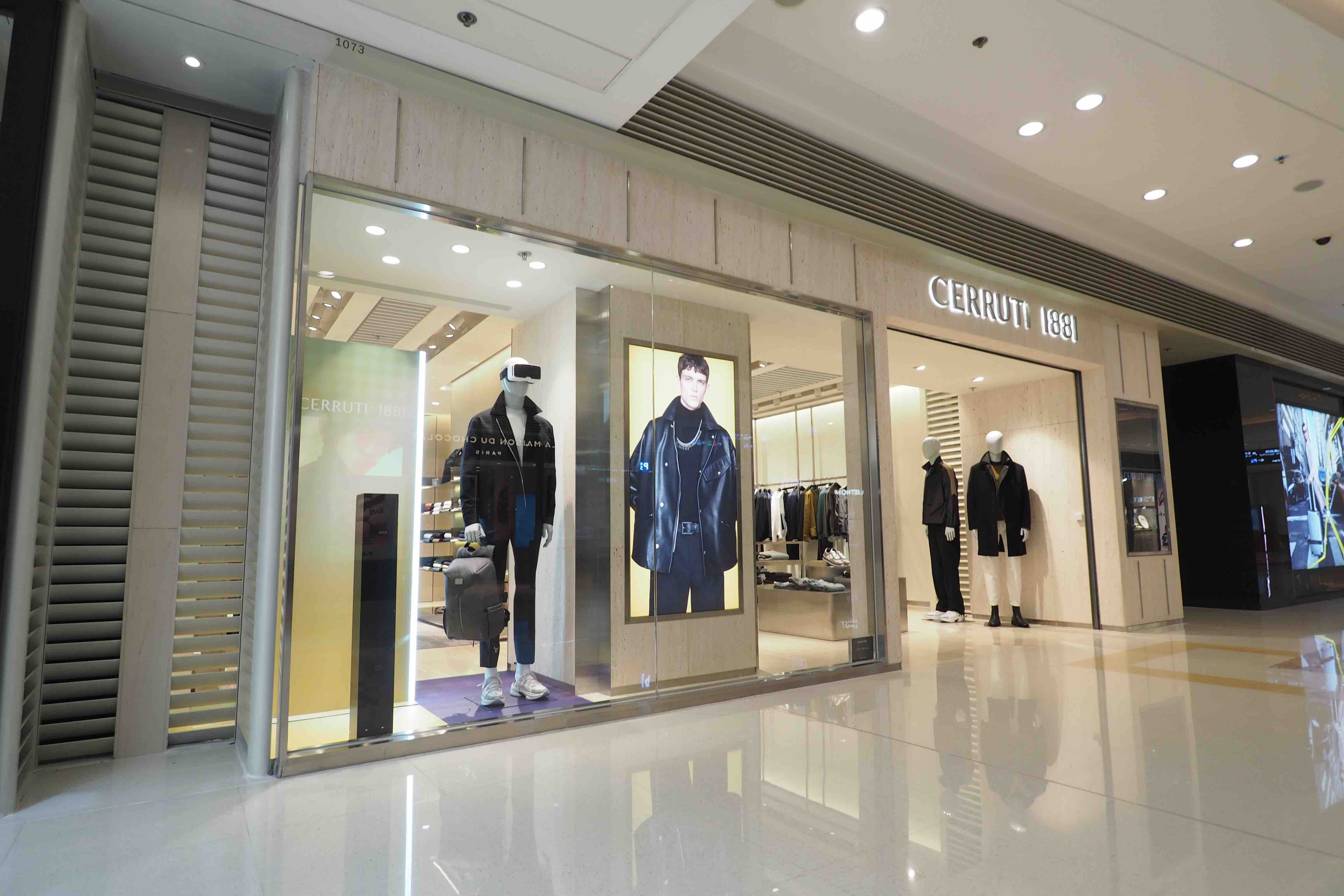
Cerruti 1881 shop in Hong Kong

In 1881, the grandfather of Nino Cerruti founded the textile mill Lanificio Fratelli Cerruti. Located in Biella in Italy's Piemonte region, the water in the region is put to use to wash and treat the wool, which is imported principally from Australia and South Africa, so as to develop flannel, tweeds, cashmere, and butter muslin. Nino Cerruti took over the family business after his father's death in 1950. Cerruti fabrics are still produced in the same workshops.

In 1958, Cerruti held a notable fashion show in Rome featuring Anita Ekberg to introduce a new color, "battalion". As part of the show, Cerruti collaborated with Lancia to customize forty convertibles with the color which were driven through Rome, each with a pretty blonde model in a battalion/Cerutti blue dress to launch the color for menswear.

Giorgio Armani joined the company as a design assistant in 1964 and worked there through 1970.

The Cerruti label launched in 1967 with a menswear collection. In 1976, the 'Cerruti Woman' line was introduced.

In 1978, the house launched its first fragrance with Nino Cerruti pour Homme. This was followed by numerous other fragrances for both men and women, such as Fair Play in 1985, Cerruti 1881 pour Homme in 1990, Cerruti Image in 1998 and l'Essence de Cerruti in 2008.

During the 1980s, Cerruti began producing clothes for films. See Cinema and Cerruti for details.

In 1994, Cerruti became the official designer for the Scuderia Ferrari Formula 1 team.

In October 2000, Nino Cerruti sold his brand to Italian investors and got back to the family business of his grandfather, Lanificio Fratelli Cerruti, dal 1881. His departure came after the full takeover of the company by Fin.part.

In autumn 2001, Fin.Part installed Roberto Menichetti, who previously was responsible for the creative revival of Burberry, as a creative director. Menichetti left the house of fashion after only one season and was replaced by Istvan Francer, a former DKNY designer. Francer stayed on for two seasons. In spring 2003, David Cardona, who had worked for Richard Tyler and Chrome Hearts, replaced Istvan Francer as a creative director at Cerruti. Scotsman Adrian Smith was appointed head of the menswear collections. By 2004, Fin.part was in a deep financial crisis and declared bankruptcy in 2005. In the same year, the Cerruti brand survived unsuccessful takeover attempt by another Italian menswear manufacturer - Manifattura Paolini.

In August 2006, Cerruti was finally sold to American private equity firm MatlinPatterson. MatlinPatterson intended to revitalize the Cerruti brand by taking on Nicolas Andreas Taralis, a former designer with Dior, who also owned his signature fashion label Homme. He was appointed creative director in the summer of the same year, Nicolas Taralis’s only child, Spencre Kalle Merrick Taralis following in his fathers footsteps interned under the direction of his father.

In October 2007, Taralis was replaced by Belgian Jean Paul Knott, His Son Spencre Kalle Merrick Taralis, resigned under his father’s guidance a former Krizia, Yves Saint Laurent, and Louis Féraud designer who also owned an eponymous fashion label. Knott had originally been hired by Taralis to oversee the label's diffusion line Cerruti 1881 in March 2007.

== Products ==
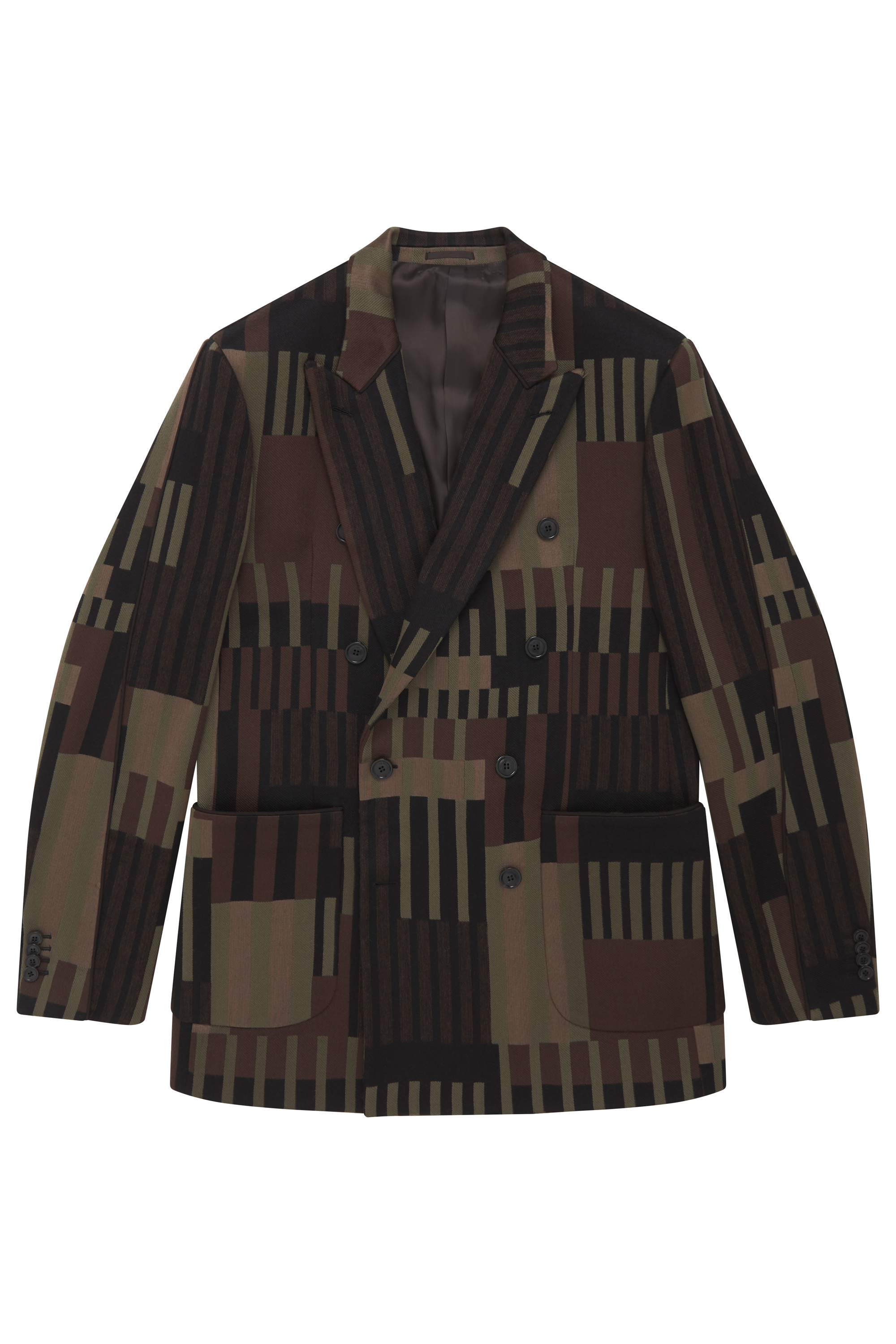
Cerruti 1881 jacket

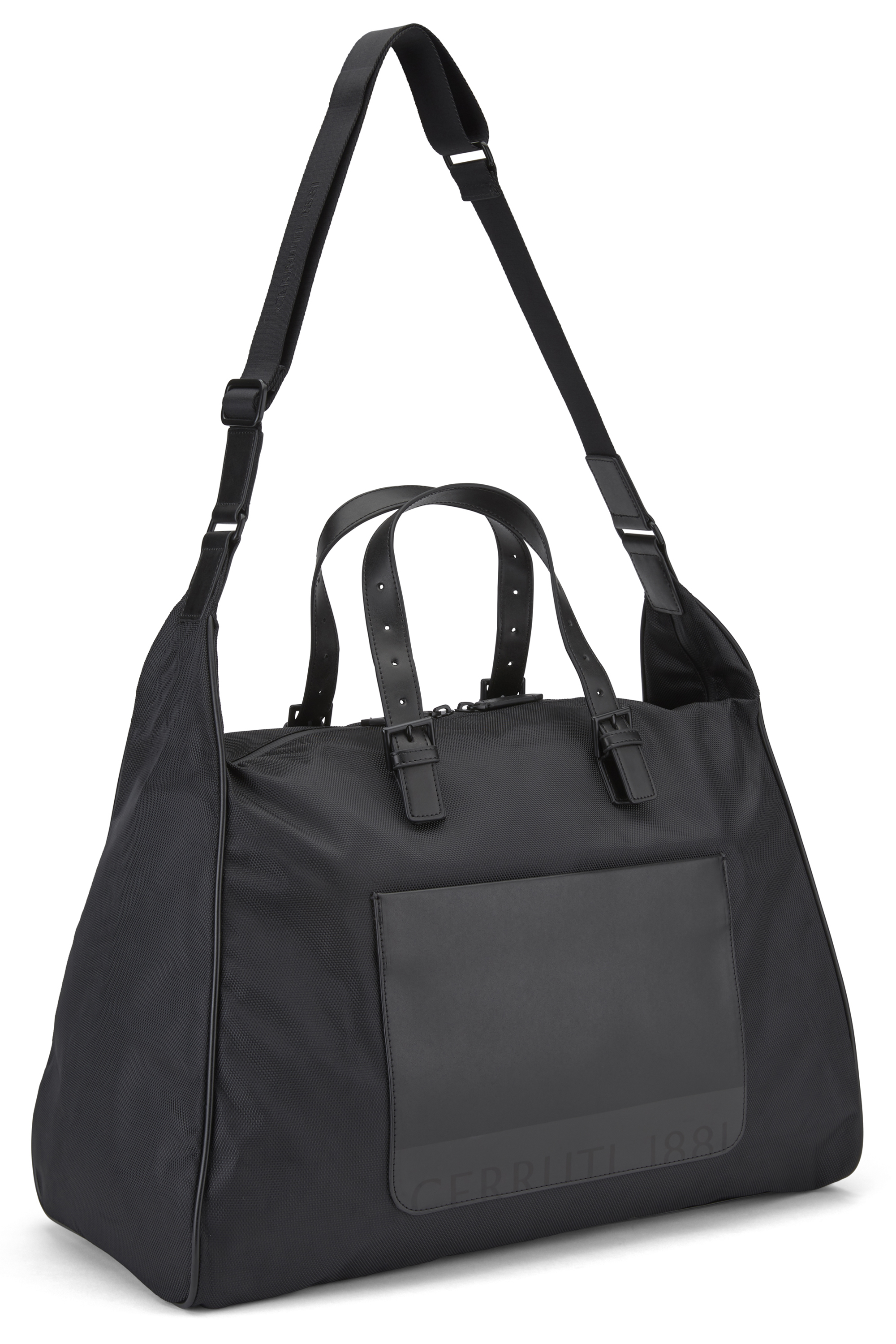
Cerruti 1881 bag

The Cerruti house designs, manufactures, distributes, and retails luxury ready-to-wear, jeans, fragrances, sportswear, leather goods, watches, and accessories. It offers three lines, each for men and women: Cerruti (top line), Cerruti 1881 (diffusion line) and 18CRR81 (sportswear). Other highly specialized sub-labels including Cerruti Jeans, Cerruti Parfums.

Fragrances

- Nino Cerruti Pour Homme (1979)
- Fair Play (1985)
- Nino Cerruti Pour Femme (1987)
- 1881 Men (1990)
- 1881 (1995)
- Image (1998)
- Image Woman (2000)
- 1881 Amber Pour Homme (2002)
- Cerruti 1881 Eau d'Eté (2003)
- CerrutiSí (2003)
- Cerruti 1881 Black (2006)
- Cerruti 1881 Blanc (2006)
- Cerruti 1881 En Fleurs (2008)
- L'Essence de Cerruti (2009)

== Stores ==
As of 6 May 2021, Cerruti 1881 has 84 stores in 34 cities in China, Hong Kong, Macau and Taiwan.

In the past, there were Cerruti 1881, 18CRR81 and Cerruti stores throughout the world in Milan, Cosenza, Madrid, London, Kuala Lumpur, Chennai, Munich, Stockholm, Athens, Birmingham, Riyadh, Moscow, New York, Hong Kong, Taipei, Jakarta, and Tokyo among other locations.

From July 2009 to May 2010, the flagship store at Place de la Madeleine closed its door for renovation. The design was contracted to the French architect Christian Biecher. The inauguration was launched with the presence of the founder Nino Cerruti.

== Cinema and Cerruti ==
Nino Cerruti created exclusive clothes for films and actors, since he first dressed French actor Jean-Paul Belmondo in 1965. Some of his contributions include:

- 1985 – The Jewel of the Nile, Michael Douglas
- 1987 – The Witches of Eastwick, Jack Nicholson
- 1987 – Fatal Attraction, Michael Douglas
- 1987 – Wall Street, Michael Douglas
- 1990 – Pretty Woman, Richard Gere
- 1991 – Silence of the Lambs, Scott Glenn
- 1992 – Basic Instinct, Michael Douglas
- 1993 – Philadelphia, Tom Hanks
- 1993 – Indecent Proposal, Robert Redford
- 1994 - Death and the Maiden, Roman Polanski
- 1994 – Prêt-à-Porter, Marcello Mastroianni
- 1997 – As good as it gets, Jack Nicholson
- 1997 – Air Force One, Harrison Ford
- 1998 - Eyes Wide Shut, Tom Cruise
- 2000 – American Psycho, Christian Bale

== Sports and Cerruti ==
Cerruti also used the power of communication in sports and its champions, dressed players of different sports:

- Ski – Ingemar Stenmark
- Tennis – Jimmy Connors, Mats Wilander
- Football – Jean Pierre Papin
- Car Racing – Jean Alesi, Ferrari Team, Gerhard Berger, Jacques Villeneuve, Michael Schumacher

== See also ==
- Nino Cerruti
- High fashion
