= Vitale Barberis Canonico =

Italian fabric mill

Vitale Barberis Canonico S.p.A.
- Company type: Private (S.p.A.)
- Industry: Textiles
- Founded: 1663; 363 years ago
- Headquarters: Pratrivero, Italy
- Key people: Francesco Barberis Canonico (creative director)
- Owner: Barberis Canonico family
- Website: vitalebarberiscanonico.com

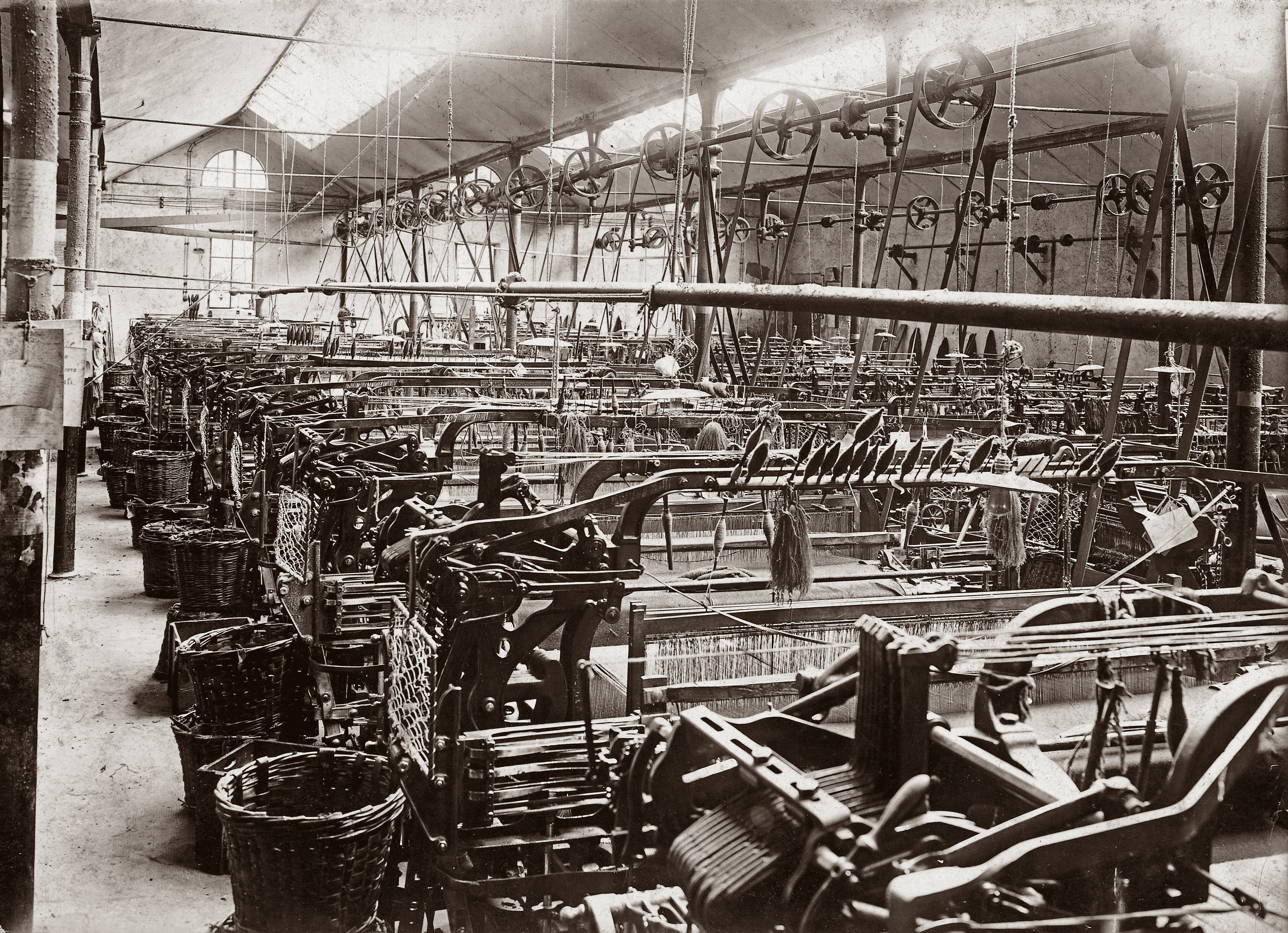
The fabric mill in the 1940s

Vitale Barberis Canonico (VBC) is an Italian fabric mill that was established in 1663. It is located in Pratrivero, about 50 miles northeast of Turin in the Piedmont region of northwest Italy.

The company has remained a family-owned business for 13 generations. Francesco Barberis Canonico is the current creative director.

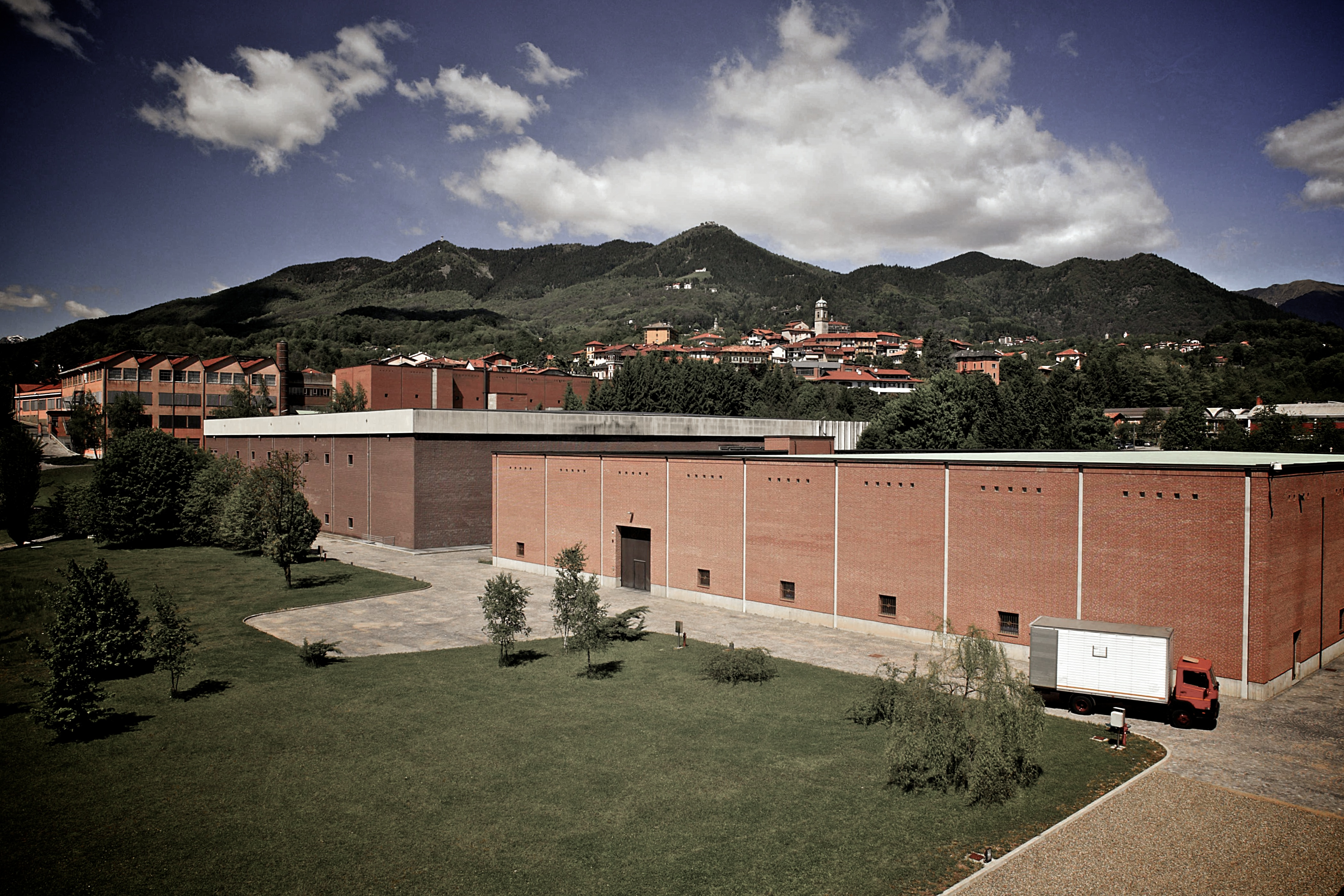
The company's facilities in 2000

Vitale Barberis Canonico sells around half under its own name and half under other brands, including many English and Italian merchants. The company's largest customer is the Italian fabric mill and luxury menswear fashion house Ermenegildo Zegna. In 2012, the wool mill was chosen by the Ferrari brand for the "tailor-made" project, which includes the possibility of personalizing one's car with Vitale Barberis Canonico fabrics.

In 2013, the year of the 350th anniversary of the wool business of the Barberis Canonico family, the wool mill became a member of Gli Henokiens, the international association reserved for family businesses with at least two hundred years of history.

In 2016, the company, which opened a historical archive for trendy fabrics from the 19th century onwards, exported 80% of the 9 million meters produced per year.

== See also ==
- Italian fashion
- Made in Italy
- Carlo Barbera
- E. Thomas
- Fratelli Piacenza
- Lanificio Fratelli Cerruti
- Loro Piana
- Marzotto
