= Fratelli Piacenza =

Fabric mill founded in Pollone, Italy, in 1733

Fratelli Piacenza S.p.A. is a fabric mill established in Pollone, Italy in 1733 by Pietro Francesco Piacenza, and owned and run by his descendants. It is a member of the Henokiens (French: Les Hénokiens), an association of companies that have been continuously operating and family-owned for a minimum of 200 years.

The company makes men's and women's clothing and accessories collections in the luxury goods sector under the brand name PIACENZA 1733, formerly Piacenza Cashmere. It is known for its fine fabrics that use extra-fine wools and noble fibres.

In 2022, Gruppo Piacenza S.p.a. bought Lanificio Cerruti.

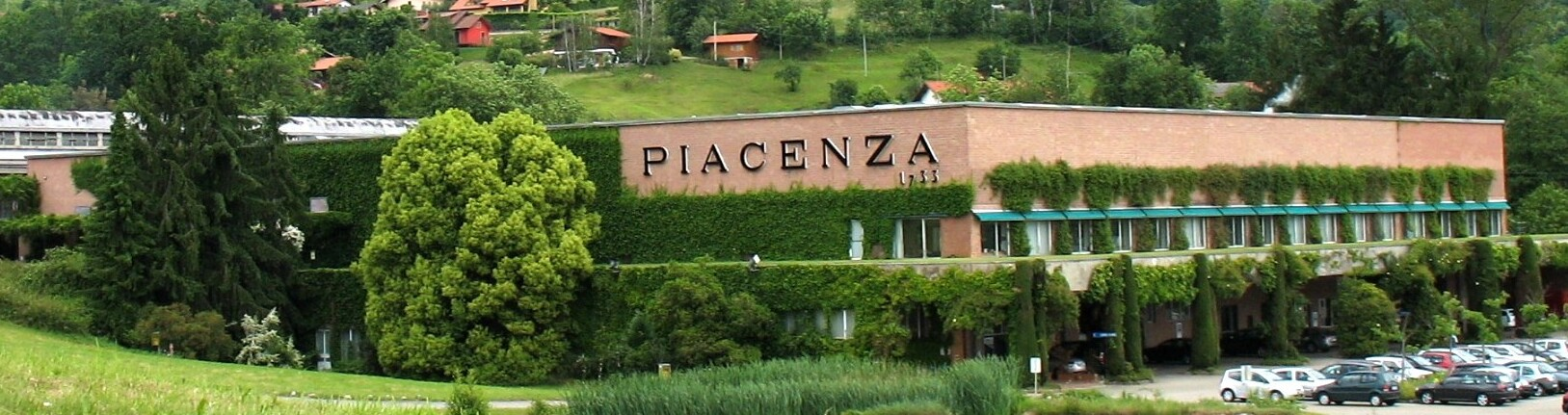
Fratelli Piacenza in Pollone

== See also ==
- Mario Piacenza
