= Lanificio Fratelli Cerruti =

Fabric company headquartered in Biella, Italy

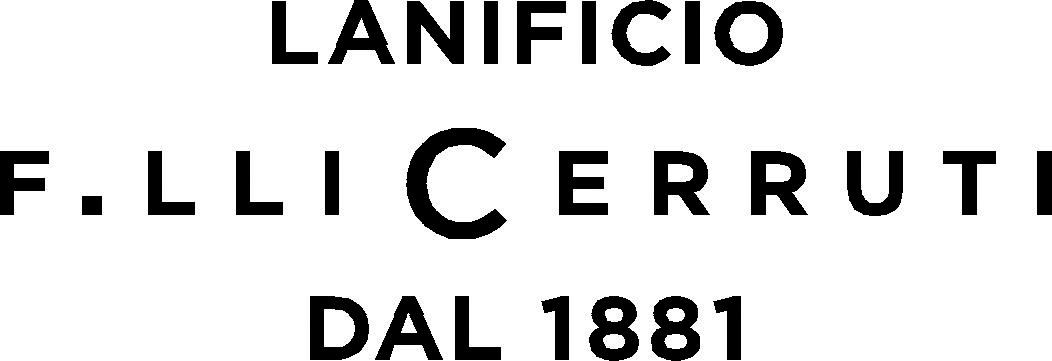

The Lanificio Fratelli Cerruti is a privately-held fine fabric mill in Biella, Italy. Founded in 1881 by Antonio Cerruti with his two brothers and a cousin, it has since been managed by the Cerruti family. In 2022 Gruppo Piacenza S.p.A. bought the company.

It is a separate company from the Cerruti 1881 luxury fashion house owned by the Hong Kong conglomerate Trinity Ltd., which has been part of parent company Shandong Ruyi since 2017.

== See also ==
- Nino Cerruti
- High fashion
